This list of the Cenozoic life of Colorado contains the various prehistoric life-forms whose fossilized remains have been reported from within the US state of Colorado and are between 66 million and 10,000 years of age.

A

  Abies
 †Abies longirostris
 †Absarokius
 †Absarokius abbotti – or unidentified comparable form
 †Absarokius metoecus
 †Absyrtus
 †Absyrtus decrepitus – type locality for species
 †Acaenitus
 †Acaenitus defunctus – type locality for species
 †Acalles
 †Acalles exhumatus – type locality for species
 †Acallomyia
 †Acallomyia probolaea – type locality for species
 †Acalyptus
 †Acalyptus obtusus – type locality for species
 †Acanthomyites – type locality for genus
 †Acanthomyites aldrichi – type locality for species
 †Acarictis – or unidentified comparable form
 †Acarictis ryani
 Acer
 †Acer florissanti
 †Acer fragile
 †Acer macginitiei
 †Acer oregonianum
 †Achrestocoris – type locality for genus
 †Achrestocoris cinerarius – type locality for species
 †Acilius
 †Acilius florissantensis – type locality for species
 †Aciprion – type locality for genus
 †Aciprion formosum – type locality for species
 †Aciprion majus – type locality for species
 †Acnemia
 †Acnemia cyclosoma – type locality for species
 †Acocephalus
 †Acocephalus callosus – type locality for species
 Acris
 †Acritoparamys
 †Acritoparamys atwateri
 †Acritoparamys pattersoni
 Acrostichum
 †Acrostichum hesperium
 †Acylophorus
 †Acylophorus immotus – type locality for species
 †Adalia
 †Adalia subversa – type locality for species
 †Adelocera
 †Adelocera perantiqua – type locality for species
 †Adelopsyche – type locality for genus
 †Adelopsyche frustrans – type locality for species
 †Adjidaumo
 †Adjidaumo minimus
 †Adjidaumo minutus
 †Adocus
 Aegialia
 †Aegialia opaca
†Aelurodon
 †Aelurodon asthenostylus
  †Aepycamelus
 †Aepycamelus giraffinus
 Aeshna
 †Aeshna larvata – type locality for species
 †Aeshna solida – type locality for species
 Agabus
 †Agabus charon – type locality for species
 †Agabus florissantensis – type locality for species
 †Agabus infuscatus
 †Agabus rathbuni – type locality for species
 †Agallia
 †Agallia abstructa – type locality for species
 †Agallia flaccida – type locality for species
 †Agallia instabilis – type locality for species
 †Agallia lewisii – type locality for species
 †Agathemera
 †Agathemera reclusa – type locality for species
   Agelaius
 †Agelaius phoenicieus
 †Agenia
 †Agenia cockerellae – type locality for species
 †Agenia saxigena – type locality for species
 †Agnotocastor
 †Agnotocastor coloradensis – type locality for species
 Agoliinus
 †Agoliinus plutonicus
Agrilus
 †Agrilus liragus
 †Agrilus praepolitus – type locality for species
 †Agrion
 †Agrion exsularis – type locality for species
 †Agrion mascescens – type locality for species
 †Agrion telluris – type locality for species
   Agriotes
 †Agriotes apicalis
 †Agriotes comminutus – type locality for species
 †Agriotes nearcticus – type locality for species
 †Agromyza
 †Agromyza praecursor – type locality for species
 †Agulla
 †Agulla protomaculata – type locality for species
 †Agyrtes
 †Agyrtes primoticus – type locality for species
 †Ailanthus
 †Ailanthus americana
 †Ailanthus lesquereuxi
 †Aleocharopsis
 †Aleocharopsis caseyi – type locality for species
 †Aleocharopsis secunda – type locality for species
 †Alepidophora – type locality for genus
 †Alepidophora cockerelli – type locality for species
 †Alepidophora minor – type locality for species
 †Alepidophora pealei – type locality for species
 †Aletodon
 †Aletodon gunnelli – or unidentified comparable form
Aleurites
 †Aleurites glandulosa
 †Alforjas – tentative report
 †Alismaphyllites
 †Alismaphyllites grandifolius
 †Allantodiopsis
 †Allantodiopsis erosa
   †Allognathosuchus
 †Allognathosuchus polyodon
 †Allophaiomys
 †Allophaiomys pliocaenicus
 †Allophylus
 †Allophylus flexifolia
 †Alomatia – type locality for genus
 †Alomatia fusca – type locality for species
Altica
 †Altica renovata – type locality for species
 †Alticonus – type locality for genus
 †Alticonus gazini – type locality for species
 †Alysia
 †Alysia exigua – type locality for species
 †Alysia petrina – type locality for species
 †Alysia phanerognatha – type locality for species
 †Alysia ruskii – type locality for species
 Amara
 †Amara cockerelli – type locality for species
 †Amara danae – type locality for species
 †Amara powellii – type locality for species
 †Amara revocata – type locality for species
 †Amara sterilis
 †Amara veterata – type locality for species
 †Amartus
 †Amartus petrefactus – type locality for species
 †Amauropilio
 †Amauropilio atavus – type locality for species
 †Amauropilio lacoei – type locality for species
 †Amblycorypha – tentative report
 †Amblycorypha perdita – type locality for species
 †Amblyteles
 †Amblyteles pealei – type locality for species
 †Ambystoma
 †Ambystoma alamosensis – type locality for species
   †Ambystoma tigrinum
   †Amebelodon
 †Amebelodon floridanus
 Amelanchier
 †Amelanchier peritula
 †Amelanchier scudderi
 Amia
 †Ammophila
 †Ammophila antiquella – type locality for species
 †Ampelopsis
 †Ampelopsis acerifolia
 †Amphechinus
 †Amphechinus horncloudi
 †Amphicerus
 †Amphicerus sublaevis
 Amphicosmus
 †Amphicosmus delicatulus – type locality for species
   †Amphicyon
 †Amphicyon galushai
 †Amphicyon ingens
 †Amphicyrta
 †Amphicyrta inhaesa – type locality for species
   †Amphimachairodus
 †Amphimachairodus coloradensis
 †Ampliconus – type locality for genus
 †Ampliconus browni – type locality for species
 †Anabrus
 †Anabrus caudelli – type locality for species
 Anas
 †Anasa
 †Anasa priscoputida – type locality for species
 †Anatis
 †Anatis resurgens – type locality for species
 †Anchastus
 †Anchastus diluvialis – type locality for species
 †Anchastus eruptus – type locality for species
 †Anchitherium
 †Anconatus – type locality for genus
 †Anconatus dorsuosus – type locality for species
 †Anconatus niger – type locality for species
 Andrena
 †Andrena clavula – type locality for species
 †Andrena grandipes – type locality for species
 †Andrena hypolitha – type locality for species
 †Andrena lagopus
 †Andrena percontusa – type locality for species
 †Andrena sepulta – type locality for species
 †Andrenopteryx
 †Andrenopteryx willardi
   †Andrias
 †Andrias matthewi
 †Andricus
 †Andricus myricae – type locality for species
 †Anelaphus
 †Anelaphus extinctus – type locality for species
 †Anemia
 †Anemia elongata
   †Angustidens
 †Angustidens vireti
 †Anisonchus
 †Anisonchus athelas – or unidentified comparable form
 Anisotoma
 †Anisotoma sibylla – type locality for species
 †Ankylodon
 †Ankylodon annectens
 †Anobium
 †Anobium durescens – type locality for species
 †Anomala
 †Anomala exterranea – type locality for species
 †Anomala scudderi – type locality for species
 †Anomalon
 †Anomalon deletum – type locality for species
 †Anomalon excisum – type locality for species
 †Anomalon miocenicum – type locality for species
 Anser
 †Antas
 †Antas crecca
   Anthaxia
 †Anthaxia exhumata – type locality for species
 †Anthaxia prasina
 †Antherophagus
 †Antherophagus megalops – type locality for species
   †Anthidium
 †Anthidium exhumatum – type locality for species
 †Anthidium scudderi – type locality for species
 †Antholithes
 †Antholithes amoenus
 †Antholithes pediloides
   †Anthomyia
 †Anthomyia atavella – type locality for species
 †Anthomyia laminarum – type locality for species
 †Anthomyia persepulta – type locality for species
 †Anthomyia winchesteri – type locality for species
Anthonomus
 †Anthonomus concussus – type locality for species
 †Anthonomus debilatus – type locality for species
 †Anthonomus defossus – type locality for species
 †Anthonomus evigilatus – type locality for species
 †Anthonomus primordius – type locality for species
 †Anthonomus rohweri – type locality for species
 †Anthonomus soporus
 †Anthophora
 †Anthophora melfordi – type locality for species
 †Antiacodon
 †Antiacodon pygmaeus
   Antilocapra
 †Antilocapra americana
 †Antocha
 †Antocha principialis – type locality for species
 †Apanthesis – type locality for genus
 †Apanthesis leuce – type locality for species
 †Apatosciuravus
 †Apatosciuravus bifax
 †Aphaena
 †Aphaena atava – type locality for species
 Aphaenogaster
 †Aphaenogaster donisthorpei – type locality for species
  †Aphaenogaster mayri – type locality for species
 †Apheliscus
 †Aphelops
 †Aphelops malacorhinus
 †Aphelops megalodus
 †Aphelops mutilus
 †Aphidopsis
 †Aphidopsis margarum – type locality for species
Aphodius
 †Aphodius aboriginalis – type locality for species
 †Aphodius florissantensis – type locality for species
 †Aphodius granarioides – type locality for species
 †Aphodius inundatus – type locality for species
 †Aphodius laminicola – type locality for species
 †Aphodius mediaevus – type locality for species
 †Aphodius praeemptor – type locality for species
 †Aphodius senex – type locality for species
 †Aphodius shoshonis – type locality for species
   Aphrophora
 Apion
 †Apion attenuatum
 †Apion cockerelli – type locality for species
 †Apion evestigatum – type locality for species
 †Apocymospermum
 †Apocynophyllum
 †Apocynophyllum lesquereuxi
 †Apolysis
 †Apolysis magister – type locality for species
 †Aporema – type locality for genus
 †Aporema praestrictum – type locality for species
 †Apsilocephala
 †Apsilocephala vagabunda – type locality for species
 †Apternodus
 †Apternodus iliffensis
 Aquila
   †Aquila chysaetos
 †Araneaovoius
 †Araneaovoius columbiae
Araneus
 †Araneus absconditus – type locality for species
 †Araneus cinefactus – type locality for species
 †Araneus delitus – type locality for species
 †Araneus emertoni – type locality for species
 †Araneus kinchloeae – type locality for species
 †Araneus longimanus – type locality for species
 †Araneus meeki – type locality for species
 †Araneus vulcanalis – type locality for species
 †Archaeochrysa
 †Archaeochrysa creedei – type locality for species
 †Archaeochrysa fracta – type locality for species
 †Archaeochrysa paranervis – type locality for species
 †Archaeomnium
 †Archaeomnium brownii
   †Archaeotherium
 †Archaeotherium mortoni
 †Archalia – type locality for genus
 †Archalia femorata – type locality for species
 †Archimyrmex – type locality for genus
  †Archimyrmex rostratus – type locality for species
 †Archiponera – type locality for genus
 †Archiponera wheeleri – type locality for species
 †Archiraphidia
 †Archiraphidia somnolenta – type locality for species
 †Archiraphidia tranquilla – type locality for species
 †Archiraphidia tumulata – type locality for species
 Arctobyrrhus
 †Arctobyrrhus subcanus
   †Arctocyon
 †Arctocyon mumak
 †Arctodontomys
 †Arctodontomys nuptus
 †Arctodontomys wilsoni
 †Arctostylops – tentative report
 †Arfia
 †Arfia opisthotoma
 †Arfia shoshoniensis
 †Argia
 †Argia aliena – type locality for species
 †Arhopalus
 †Arhopalus pavitus – type locality for species
   †Aristolochia
 †Aristolochia mortua
 †Artimonius
 †Artimonius australis
 †Artimonius nocerai
 †Artocarpus
 †Artocarpus lessigiana
 †Asilus
 †Asilus amelanchieris – type locality for species
 †Asilus curculionis – type locality for species
 †Asilus florissantinus – type locality for species
 †Asilus peritulus – type locality for species
 †Asilus wickhami – type locality for species
   †Asimina
 †Asimina vesperalis
 Asio
 †Aspicolpus
 †Aspicolpus repertus – type locality for species
 †Asplenium
 †Asplenium delicatula – or unidentified comparable form
 †Astephus
 †Aster
 †Aster florissantia
 †Asterocarpinus
 †Asterocarpinus perplexans
   †Astronium
 †Astronium calyx
 †Astronium truncatum
 Asynarchus
 Ataenius
 †Ataenius patescens – type locality for species
 †Ataenius restructus – type locality for species
 †Atalantycha
 †Atalantycha humata – type locality for species
 †Athalia
 †Athalia wheeleri – type locality for species
 Atheta
 †Atheta florissantensis – type locality for species
   †Athous
 †Athous contusus – type locality for species
 †Athous fractus – type locality for species
 †Athous lethalis – type locality for species
 †Athyana
 †Athyana haydenii
 †Atocus – type locality for genus
 †Atocus cockerelli – type locality for species
 †Atocus defessus – type locality for species
 †Atrichops
 †Atrichops hesperius – type locality for species
 †Attagenus
 †Attagenus aboriginalis – type locality for species
 †Attagenus sopitus – type locality for species
 †Aulacidea
 †Aulacidea ampliforma – type locality for species
 †Aulacidea progenetrix – type locality for species
 †Aulacus
 †Aulacus bradleyi – type locality for species
 †Aulobaris
 †Aulobaris anicilla – type locality for species
 †Aulobaris circumscripta
 †Aulobaris damnata – type locality for species
 †Auraria – type locality for genus
 †Auraria urbana – type locality for species
 †Averrhoites
 †Averrhoites affinis
 †Axestemys – type locality for genus
 †Axestemys puercensis – or unidentified comparable form
 †Axestemys quinni – type locality for species
 Aythya
 †Aythya affinis
   †Aythya americana
   †Aztlanolagus

B

 †Baena
 †Baena arenosa
 †Baioconodon
 †Baioconodon denverensis – type locality for species
 †Baioconodon nordicus
 †Baltemys
 †Baltemys velogastros – type locality for species
 †Baptemys
 †Baptemys wyomingensis
 †Barbouromeryx
 †Baris
 †Baris antediluviana – type locality for species
 †Baris cremastorhynchoides – type locality for species
 †Baris divisa – type locality for species
 †Baris florissantensis – type locality for species
 †Baris harlani – type locality for species
 †Baris hoveyi – type locality for species
 †Baris imperfecta – type locality for species
 †Baris matura – type locality for species
 †Baris nearctica – type locality for species
 †Baris primalis – type locality for species
 †Baris renovata – type locality for species
 †Baris schucherti – type locality for species
     †Barylambda
 †Barylambda faberi – type locality for species
 †Barylypa
 †Barylypa primigena – type locality for species
 †Bassus
 †Bassus juvenilis – type locality for species
 †Bassus miocenicus – type locality for species
 †Bassus velatus – type locality for species
 †Bathornis – type locality for genus
 †Bathornis veredus – type locality for species
 †Bathygenys
 †Bathygenys alpha
  †Bathyopsis
 †Bathyopsis fissidens
 †Belyta
 †Belyta mortuella – type locality for species
   Bembidion
 †Bembidion bimaculatum
 †Bembidion breve
 †Bembidion coloradense
 †Bembidion constricticolle
 †Bembidium
 †Bembidium florissantensis – type locality for species
 †Bembidium obductum – type locality for species
 †Bembidium tumulorum – type locality for species
 †Beringiaphyllum
 †Beringiaphyllum cupanioides
 †Beris
 †Beris miocenica – type locality for species
   Betula
 †Betula stevensoni
 Bibio
 †Bibio capnodes – type locality for species
 †Bibio cockerelli – type locality for species
 †Bibio excurvatus – type locality for species
 †Bibio explanatus – type locality for species
 †Bibio jamesi – type locality for species
 †Bibio podager – type locality for species
 †Bibio vetus – type locality for species
 †Bibio vulcanius – type locality for species
 †Bibio wickhami – type locality for species
 †Bibiodes
 †Bibiodes intermedia – type locality for species
 †Bidessus
 †Bidessus laminarum – type locality for species
 Bison
   †Bison antiquus – or unidentified comparable form
   †Bison latifrons
 †Blapstinus
 †Blapstinus linellii – type locality for species
 †Blechnum
 †Blechnum anceps
 Bledius
 †Bledius osborni
 †Bledius primitiarum – type locality for species
 †Bledius soli – type locality for species
 †Bledius suturalis
 †Blickomylus
 †Blickomylus galushai
 Boletina
 †Boletina hypogaea – type locality for species
   †Borealosuchus
   †Borophagus
 †Borophagus pugnator
 †Bouromeryx
 †Bouromeryx americanus – type locality for species
 †Brachinus
 †Brachinus newberryi – type locality for species
 †Brachinus repressus – type locality for species
   †Brachycrus
 †Brachyerix
 †Brachyerix macrotis
 Brachylagus
 †Brachylagus coloradoensis – type locality for species
 †Brachyprotoma
 †Brachyprotoma obtusata
 †Brachypsalis
 †Brachypsalis modicus
   †Brachyrhynchocyon
 †Brachyspathus – type locality for genus
 †Brachyspathus curiosus – type locality for species
 †Brachytarsus – tentative report
 †Brachytarsus dubius – type locality for species
 Bracon
 †Bracon abstractus – type locality for species
 †Bracon cockerelli – type locality for species
 †Bracon resurrectus – type locality for species
   †Bruchus
 †Bruchus aboriginalis – type locality for species
 †Bruchus anilis – type locality for species
 †Bruchus antaeus – type locality for species
 †Bruchus bowditchi – type locality for species
 †Bruchus carpophiloides – type locality for species
 †Bruchus dormescens – type locality for species
 †Bruchus exhumatus – type locality for species
 †Bruchus henshawi – type locality for species
 †Bruchus osborni – type locality for species
 †Bruchus succintus – type locality for species
 †Bruesisca
 †Bruesisca submersus – type locality for species
 Bubo
   †Bubo virginianus
 Bufo
 †Bufo cognatus
 †Bufo douglassi
 †Bufo woodhousei
 †Bunophorus
 †Bunophorus grangeri
 †Bunophorus pattersoni
 †Bunophorus robustus
 †Bunophorus sinclairi
 †Buprestis
 †Buprestis florissantensis – type locality for species
 †Buprestis megistarche – type locality for species
 †Buprestis scudderi – type locality for species
 †Bursera
 †Bursera serrulata
   Buteo
 †Buteo fluviaticus – type locality for species
 Byrrhus
 †Byrrhus eximius
 †Byrrhus romingeri
 †Bythoscopus
 †Bythoscopus lapidescens – type locality for species

C

 †Cacalydus – type locality for genus
 †Cacalydus exstirpatus – type locality for species
 †Cacalydus lapsus – type locality for species
 †Cacogaster – type locality for genus
 †Cacogaster novamaculatus – type locality for species
 †Cacoschistus – type locality for genus
 †Cacoschistus maceriatus – type locality for species
 †Caenocholax
 †Caenocholax barkleyi – type locality for species
 †Caenocholax palusaxus – type locality for species
   †Caesalpinia
 †Caesalpinia pecorae
 †Caesalpinites
 †Caesalpinites acuminatus
 †Caesalpinites coloradicus
 †Calamagras – type locality for genus
 †Calamagras angulatus – type locality for species
 †Calamagras murivorus – type locality for species
 †Calamagras talpivorus – type locality for species
 †Calandrites
 †Calandrites cineratius
 †Calandrites defessus
 †Calandrites hindsi – type locality for species
 †Calandrites ursorum – type locality for species
 †Calcarius
   †Calcarius lapponicus
   †Calcarius ornatus
 †Calippus
 †Calippus regulus
 †Caliroa
 †Caliroa micrarche – type locality for species
 †Caliroa mimus – type locality for species
 †Caliroa revelata – type locality for species
 †Callidiopsites – type locality for genus
 †Callidiopsites grandiceps – type locality for species
 †Callimoxys
 †Callimoxys primordialis – type locality for species
 †Callomyia – tentative report
 †Callomyia hypolitha – type locality for species
 Calosoma
 †Calosoma calvini – type locality for species
 †Calosoma cockerelli – type locality for species
 †Calosoma emmonsi – type locality for species
 †Calyptapis – type locality for genus
 †Calyptapis florissantensis – type locality for species
   †Camelops
 †Camelops hesternus
 †Camerotops
 †Camerotops solidatus – type locality for species
Camponotus
 †Camponotus fuscipennis – type locality for species
 †Camponotus microcephalus – type locality for species
 †Camponotus petrifactus – type locality for species
 Canis
 †Canis edwardii – or unidentified comparable form
   †Canis latrans
 †Cantius
 †Cantius abditus
 †Cantius frugivorus
 †Cantius mckennai
 †Cantius ralstoni
 †Capnobotes
 †Capnobotes silens
 †Capnochroa
 †Capnochroa senilis – type locality for species
 †Capsus
 †Capsus lacus – type locality for species
 †Capsus obsolefactus – type locality for species
 †Carabites – tentative report
 †Carabites arapahoensis – type locality for species
Carabus
 †Carabus jeffersoni – type locality for species
 †Cardichelyon
 †Cardichelyon rogerwoodi – or unidentified comparable form
 †Cardiolophus
 †Cardiolophus radinskyi
   †Cardiophorus
 †Cardiophorus cockerelli – type locality for species
 †Cardiophorus deprivatus – type locality for species
 †Cardiophorus exhumatus – type locality for species
 †Cardiophorus florissantensis – type locality for species
 †Cardiophorus lithographicus – type locality for species
 †Cardiophorus requiescens – type locality for species
 Cardiospermum
  †Cardiospermum coloradensis
 †Cardiospermum terminalis
 †Cariblattoides
 †Cariblattoides labandeirai – type locality for species
 †Carmelus
 †Carmelus gravatus – type locality for species
 †Carmelus sepositus – type locality for species
 †Carpites
 †Carpites gemmaceus
 †Carpites miliodes
 †Carpocyon
 †Carpocyon compressus
 †Carpocyon robustus
 Carpodacus
   †Carpodacus cassinii
 †Carpodaptes
 †Carpodaptes aulacodon – type locality for species
 †Carpodaptes cygneus
 †Carpophilus
 †Carpophilus restructus – type locality for species
   Carya
 †Carya antiquorum
 †Carya florissantensis
 †Carya libbeyi
 Castanea
 †Castanea dolichophylla
 †Castanea intermedia
 †Catobaris – type locality for genus
 †Catobaris coenosa – type locality for species
 †Catopamera – type locality for genus
 †Catopamera augheyi – type locality for species
 †Catopamera bradleyi – type locality for species
 †Catopsalis
 †Catopsalis alexanderi – type locality for species
 †Catopsylla – type locality for genus
 †Catopsylla crawfordi – type locality for species
 †Catopsylla prima – type locality for species
 †Cecidomyia – tentative report
 †Cecidomyia pontaniiformis
 Cedrela
 †Cedrela lancifolia
 †Cedrelospermum
 †Cedrelospermum lineatum
 †Cedromus
 †Cedromus wardi
 †Celastrilex – type locality for genus
 †Celastrilex artocarpidioides – type locality for species. Formerly classified as Celastrinites artocarpidioides.
 †Celastrinites
 †Celastrilex artocarpidioides – type locality for species. Later reclassified as Celastrilex artocarpidioides.
   †Celastrus
 †Celastrus typica
 †Celastrus winchesteri
Celtis
 †Celtis mccoshii
 †Centetodon
 †Centetodon magnus
 †Centetodon marginalis
 †Centetodon patratus – type locality for species
 †Centimanomys
 †Centimanomys galbreathi
 †Centimanomys major
 †Centrinus
 †Centrinus hypogaeus – type locality for species
 †Centrinus obnuptus – type locality for species
 †Centrinus vulcanicus – type locality for species
 †Centrocerus
 †Centrocerus urophasianus
 †Centron – type locality for genus
 †Centron moricollis – type locality for species
 †Cephalomyrmex – type locality for genus
 †Cephalomyrmex rotundatus – type locality for species
 †Ceratina
 †Ceratina disrupta – type locality for species
   †Ceratosuchus – type locality for genus
 †Ceratosuchus burdoshi – type locality for species
 †Ceraturgus
 †Ceraturgus praecursor – type locality for species
 Cercidiphyllum
 †Cercidiphyllum arcticum
Cercis
 †Cercis parvifolia
 †Cercocarpus
 †Cercocarpus myricaefolius
 †Cercopis
 †Cercopis cephalinus – type locality for species
 †Cercopis suffocata – type locality for species
 †Ceropalites – type locality for genus
 †Ceropalites infelix – type locality for species
 †Ceruchus
 †Ceruchus fuchsii – type locality for species
 Cervus
   †Cervus elaphus
Ceutorhynchus
 †Ceutorhynchus blaisdelli – type locality for species
 †Ceutorhynchus clausus – type locality for species
 †Ceutorhynchus compactus – type locality for species
 †Ceutorhynchus degravatus – type locality for species
 †Ceutorhynchus duratus – type locality for species
 †Ceutorhynchus irvingi – type locality for species
 Chaetodipus
 †Chaetodipus hispidus
 †Chaetopleurophora
 †Chaetopleurophora laminarum – type locality for species
 †Chaetoptelea
 †Chaetoptelea microphylla
 †Chalcis
 †Chalcis perdita – type locality for species
 †Chalcis praevalens
 †Chalcis praevolans – type locality for species
 †Chalcis tortilis – type locality for species
 †Chalepus
 †Chalepus americanus – type locality for species
 †Chalybion
 †Chalybion mortuum – type locality for species
 †Chamaecyparis
 †Chamaecyparis linguaefolia
   †Chamaedorea
 †Chamaedorea danae
 †Chaneya
 †Chaneya tenuis
 Charina
 †Charina prebottae
 †Chauliognathus
 †Chauliognathus pristinus – type locality for species
 †Cheilophis – type locality for genus
 †Cheilophis huerfanoensis – type locality for species
Cheilosia
 †Cheilosia hecate – type locality for species
 †Cheilosia miocenica – type locality for species
 †Cheilosia scudderi – type locality for species
 †Cheilosia sepultula – type locality for species
 †Chelonarium
 †Chelonarium montanum – type locality for species
 †Chelonus
 †Chelonus depressus – type locality for species
 †Chelonus muratus – type locality for species
 †Chelonus solidus – type locality for species
 †Chilocorus
 †Chilocorus ulkei – type locality for species
 †Chionaemopsis – type locality for genus
 †Chionaemopsis quadrifasciatus – type locality for species
 †Chiromyoides
 †Chiromyoides caesor
 †Chiromyoides gigas
 †Chiromyoides potior – type locality for species
   Chironomus
 †Chironomus almelanderi – type locality for species
 †Chironomus depletus – type locality for species
 †Chironomus patens – type locality for species
 †Chironomus pausatus – type locality for species
 †Chironomus primaevus – type locality for species
 †Chironomus pristinus – type locality for species
 †Chironomus proterus – type locality for species
 †Chironomus requiescens – type locality for species
 †Chironomus scudderiellus – type locality for species
 Chondestes
   †Chondestes grammacus
 †Chriacus
 †Chriacus gallinae
 †Chrysis
 †Chrysis miocenica – type locality for species
 †Chrysis rohweri – type locality for species
 †Chrysobothris
 †Chrysobothris coloradensis – type locality for species
 †Chrysobothris gahani – type locality for species
 †Chrysobothris haydeni – type locality for species
 †Chrysobothris suppressa – type locality for species
 †Chrysogaster
 †Chrysogaster antiquarius – type locality for species
 Chrysomela
 †Chrysomela vesperalis – type locality for species
 †Cicada
 †Cicada grandiosa – type locality for species
 †Cicadella
 †Cicadella scudderi – type locality for species
 †Cimbex
 †Cimbex vetusculus – type locality for species
   †Cimexomys
 †Cimexomys arapahoensis – type locality for species
 †Cimexomys minor
   Cinnamomum
 †Cinnamomum sezannense
 †Cissites
 †Cissites rocklandensis
 Cissus
 †Cissus marginata
 †Cixius – tentative report
 †Cixius proavus – type locality for species
 †Cladius
 †Cladius petrinus – type locality for species
 †Cladoneura – type locality for genus
 †Cladoneura willistoni – type locality for species
 †Cladura
 †Cladura integra – type locality for species
 †Cladura maculata – type locality for species
 †Clastoptera
 †Clastoptera comstocki – type locality for species
   †Cleonus
 †Cleonus degeneratus – type locality for species
 †Cleonus estriatus – type locality for species
 †Cleonus exterraneus – type locality for species
 †Cleonus foersteri – type locality for species
 †Cleonus primoris – type locality for species
 †Cleonus rohweri – type locality for species
 †Closterocoris
 †Closterocoris elegans – type locality for species
 †Clubiona
 †Clubiona arcana
 †Clubiona curvispinosa – type locality for species
 †Clubiona eversa – type locality for species
 †Clubiona florissanti – type locality for species
 †Clytus
 †Clytus pervetustus – type locality for species
   †Coccinella
 †Coccinella florissantensis – type locality for species
 †Coccinella sodoma – type locality for species
 †Coccotorus
 †Coccotorus principalis – type locality for species
 †Coccotorus requiescens – type locality for species
 †Coeliodes
 †Coeliodes primotinus – type locality for species
 Colaptes
   †Colaptes auratus
 †Colaspis
 †Colaspis aetatis – type locality for species
 †Colaspis diluvialis – type locality for species
 †Colaspis proserpina – type locality for species
 †Colastes
 †Colastes abrogatus – type locality for species
 †Colemanus – type locality for genus
 †Colemanus keeleyorum – type locality for species
 †Collops
 †Collops desuetus – type locality for species
 †Collops extrusus – type locality for species
 †Collops priscus – type locality for species
 †Colopterus
 †Colopterus pygidialis – type locality for species
 †Colpoclaenus
 †Colpoclaenus keeferi
   †Colubrina
 †Colubrina spireaefolia
 †Colubrina spireafollia
 †Compsemys
 †Compsemys victa
 †Comptosia – type locality for genus
 †Comptosia miranda – type locality for species
 †Conacodon
 †Conacodon delphae – type locality for species
 †Conacodon harbourae – type locality for species
 †Conacodon matthewi – type locality for species
 †Coniatus
 †Coniatus refractus
 Conotelus
 †Conotelus obscurus
   †Conotrachelus
 †Conotrachelus florissantensis – type locality for species
 †Contogenys – or unidentified related form
 †Convolvulites
 †Convolvulites orichitus
 †Conzattia
 †Conzattia coriacea – type locality for species
 †Copecion
 †Copecion brachypternus
 †Copelemur
 †Copelemur praetutus
 †Cophocoris – type locality for genus
 †Cophocoris tenebricosus – type locality for species
 †Cophura
 †Cophura antiquella – type locality for species
 †Copidita
 †Copidita miocenica – type locality for species
 †Coptochromus – type locality for genus
 †Coptochromus manium – type locality for species
 †Cordilura
 †Cordilura exhumata – type locality for species
 †Corethra
 †Corethra exita – type locality for species
 Corixa
 †Corixa immersa – type locality for species
 †Corixa vanduzeei – type locality for species
 †Corizus
 †Corizus abditivus – type locality for species
 †Corizus celatus – type locality for species
 †Corizus somnurnus – type locality for species
 †Cormocyon
 †Cormocyon copei
   †Cormohipparion
 †Cormohipparion quinni
 †Cormohipparion sphenodus
 Cornus
 †Cornus hyperborea
 †Corphyra
 †Corphyra calypso – type locality for species
 Corticaria
 †Corticaria aeterna – type locality for species
 †Corticaria egregia – type locality for species
 †Corticaria occlusa – type locality for species
 †Corticaria petrefacta – type locality for species
 Corvus
 †Corvus brachyrhynchos
   †Corvus corax
 †Corylus
 †Corylus insignis
   †Coryphodon
 †Coryphodon armatus
 †Coryphodon eocaenus
 Cossonus
 †Cossonus gabbii – type locality for species
 †Cossonus rutus – type locality for species
 †Cotinus
 †Cotinus fraterna
 †Crabro
 †Crabro longaevus – type locality for species
 †Cratacanthus
 †Cratacanthus florissantensis – type locality for species
   Crataegus
 †Crataegus copeana
 †Crataegus hendersoni
 †Crataegus nupta
 †Cremastorhynchus
 †Cremastorhynchus stabilis
 †Cremastosaurus – type locality for genus
 †Cremastosaurus carinicollis – type locality for species
 †Cremastosaurus rhambastes – type locality for species
 †Cremnops
 †Cremnops florissanticola – type locality for species
 †Creniphilites – type locality for genus
 †Creniphilites orpheus – type locality for species
 †Crioceridea – type locality for genus
 †Crioceridea dubia – type locality for species
 Crotalus
   †Crotalus viridis
 †Croton
 †Croton furculatum
 †Cryptagriotes – type locality for genus
 †Cryptagriotes minusculus – type locality for species
 †Cryptocephalus
 †Cryptocephalus miocenus – type locality for species
 †Cryptocheilus
 †Cryptocheilus florissantensis – type locality for species
 †Cryptocheilus hypogaeus – type locality for species
 †Cryptocheilus laminarum – type locality for species
 †Cryptocheilus scudderi – type locality for species
 †Cryptocheilus senex – type locality for species
 †Cryptochromus – type locality for genus
 †Cryptochromus letatus – type locality for species
 Cryptohypnus
 †Cryptohypnus exterminatus – type locality for species
 †Cryptohypnus hesperus – type locality for species
   Cryptophagus
 †Cryptophagus bassleri – type locality for species
 †Cryptophagus petricola – type locality for species
 †Cryptophagus scudderi – type locality for species
Cryptorhynchus
 †Cryptorhynchus annosus
 †Cryptorhynchus coloradensis – type locality for species
 †Cryptorhynchus durus – type locality for species
 †Cryptorhynchus evinctus – type locality for species
 †Cryptorhynchus fallii – type locality for species
 †Cryptorhynchus kerri – type locality for species
 †Cryptorhynchus profusus – type locality for species
 †Cryptus
 †Cryptus delineatus – type locality for species
 †Ctereacoris – type locality for genus
 †Ctereacoris primigenus – type locality for species
   Culex
 †Culex winchesteri – type locality for species
 †Curculio
 †Curculio anicularis – type locality for species
 †Curculio beeklyi – type locality for species
 †Curculio curvirostris – type locality for species
 †Curculio duttoni – type locality for species
 †Curculio extinctus – type locality for species
 †Curculio femoratus
 †Curculio flexirostris – type locality for species
 †Curculio florissantensis – type locality for species
 †Curculio minusculoides – type locality for species
 †Curculio minusculus
 †Curculio restrictus – type locality for species
 †Cursoricoccyx – type locality for genus
 †Cursoricoccyx geraldinae – type locality for species
 †Cuterebra
 †Cuterebra ascarides – type locality for species
 †Cuterebra bibosa – type locality for species
 †Cychramites – type locality for genus
 †Cychramites hirtus – type locality for species
 †Cyclotrachelus
 †Cyclotrachelus tenebricus – type locality for species
 †Cydamus
 †Cydamus robustus – type locality for species
 †Cydnopsis
 †Cydnopsis handlirschi – type locality for species
 †Cylindrodon
 †Cylindrodon nebraskensis
 †Cylindrotoma
 †Cylindrotoma veterana – type locality for species
   †Cynarctoides
 †Cynarctoides acridens
   †Cynelos
Cynomys
 †Cynomys niobrarius
 †Cynomys spenceri – or unidentified comparable form
 †Cyperacites
 †Cyperacites lacustris – type locality for species
 †Cyphomyia
 †Cyphomyia rohweri – type locality for species
 Cyphon
 †Cyphus
 †Cyphus florissantensis – type locality for species
 †Cypris
 †Cypris florissantensis – type locality for species
 †Cyrtapis – type locality for genus
 †Cyrtapis anomala – type locality for species
 †Cyrtomon
 †Cyrtomon subterraneus – type locality for species
 Cytilus
 †Cytilus tartarinus – type locality for species
 †Cyttaromyia
 †Cyttaromyia obdurescens – type locality for species
 †Cyttaromyia princetoniana – type locality for species
 †Cyttaromyia reclusa – type locality for species

D

 †Daphne
 †Daphne septentrionalis
   Daphnia
  †Daphoenus
 †Daphoenus vetus
 †Dartonius
 †Dartonius jepseni
 †Dascillus
 †Dascillus lithographicus – type locality for species
 †Davidia
 †Davidia antiqua
 †Deleaster
 †Deleaster grandiceps – type locality for species
 †Delphax
 †Delphax senilis – type locality for species
 †Delphax veterum – type locality for species
 †Demophorus
 †Demophorus antiquus – type locality for species
 †Denaeaspis – type locality for genus
 †Denaeaspis chelonopsis – type locality for species
 †Dendragopus
 †Dendragopus obscurus
   †Dennstaedtia
 †Dennstaedtia americana
 †Denverus – type locality for genus
 †Denverus middletoni – type locality for species
 †Dermatobia
 †Dermatobia hydropica – type locality for species
 †Dermestes
 †Dermestes tertiarius – type locality for species
 †Derobrochus – type locality for genus
 †Derobrochus abstractus – type locality for species
 †Derobrochus caenulentus – type locality for species
 †Derobrochus commoratus – type locality for species
 †Derobrochus craterae – type locality for species
 †Derobrochus frigescens – type locality for species
 †Derobrochus marcidus – type locality for species
 †Derobrochus typharum – type locality for species
 †Desmatoclaenus
 †Desmatoclaenus protogonioides – or unidentified comparable form
 †Desmatomyia – type locality for genus
 †Desmatomyia scopulicornis – type locality for species
 †Detyopsis – type locality for genus
 †Detyopsis packardi – type locality for species
 †Detyopsis scudderi – type locality for species
 †Deviacer
 †Diabrotica
 †Diabrotica bowditchiana – type locality for species
 †Diabrotica exesa – type locality for species
 †Diabrotica florissantella – type locality for species
 †Diabrotica uteana – type locality for species
   †Diacodexis
 †Diacodexis kelleyi
 †Diacodexis metsiacus – or unidentified comparable form
 †Diacodexis minutus
 †Diacodexis primus
 †Diacodexis secans – or unidentified comparable form
 †Diacodon
 †Diacodon alticuspis – or unidentified comparable form
 †Dialysis
 †Dialysis revelata – type locality for species
 Dialytes
 Dialytodius
 †Dialytodius decipiens
 Diamesa
 †Diamesa extincta – type locality for species
 †Dianthidium
 †Dianthidium tertiarium – type locality for species
 †Diaplegma – type locality for genus
 †Diaplegma abductum – type locality for species
 †Diaplegma haldemani – type locality for species
 †Diaplegma occultorum – type locality for species
 †Diaplegma ruinosum – type locality for species
 †Diaplegma venerabile – type locality for species
 †Diaplegma veterascens – type locality for species
  †Diceratherium
 †Diceratherium tridactylum
 †Dicerca
 †Dicerca eurydice – type locality for species
Dicranomyia
 †Dicranomyia faecarius – type locality for species
 †Dicranomyia fontainei – type locality for species
 †Dicranomyia fragilis – type locality for species
 †Dicranomyia inferna – type locality for species
 †Dicranomyia loewi – type locality for species
 †Dicranomyia longipes – type locality for species
 †Dicranomyia primitiva
 †Dicranomyia rohweri – type locality for species
 †Dicranomyia saxetana – type locality for species
 †Dicranomyia stagnorum
 †Dicranomyia stigmosa
   †Dicranota
 †Dicranota cockerelli – type locality for species
 †Dictyla
 †Dictyla veterana – type locality for species
 †Dictyophara
 †Dictyophara bouvei – type locality for species
 †Dictyoraphidia
 †Dictyoraphidia veterana – type locality for species
 †Didelphodus
 †Didelphodus absarokae
 †Didelphodus altidens
 †Didymictis
 †Didymictis altidens
 †Didymictis leptomylus
 †Didymictis protenus
 †Didymictis proteus – or unidentified comparable form
 †Didymictis vancleveae
 †Didymosphaeria
 †Didymosphaeria betheli
 †Dikkomys
 †Dilaropsis – type locality for genus
 †Dilaropsis ornatus – type locality for species
 †Dillenites
 †Dillenites garfieldensis
 †Dilophodon
 †Dineura
 †Dineura cockerelli – type locality for species
 †Dineura fuscipennis – type locality for species
 †Dineura laminarum – type locality for species
 †Dineura microsoma – type locality for species
 †Dineura saxorum – type locality for species
     †Dinictis
 †Dinidorites – type locality for genus
 †Dinidorites margiformis – type locality for species
 †Dinoderus
 †Dinoderus cuneicollis – type locality for species
 †Dinohippus
 †Dinohippus interpolatus – or unidentified comparable form
 †Dioctria
 †Dioctria florissantina – type locality for species
 †Dioctria pulveris – type locality for species
 Dioscorea
 †Diplodipelta – type locality for genus
 †Diplodipelta reniptera
 †Diplolophus
 †Diplolophus insolens
 †Diploptera
 †Diploptera gemini – type locality for species
 †Diploptera savba – type locality for species
 †Diploptera vladimir – type locality for species
 Diplotaxis – tentative report
 Diplotaxis
 †Diplotaxis aurora – type locality for species
 †Diplotaxis simplicipes – type locality for species
 Dipodomys
   †Dipodomys ordii
 †Dipsalidictis
 †Dipsalidictis transiens
 Dipteronia
 †Dipteronia brownii
 †Dipteronia insignis
 †Dissacus
 †Dissacus navajovius
 †Docimus – type locality for genus
 †Docimus psylloides – type locality for species
 †Docirhynchus
 †Docirhynchus terebrans – type locality for species
Dodonaea
 †Dodonaea umbrina
   Dolichoderus
 †Dolichoderus antiquus – type locality for species
 †Dolichoderus kohlsi – type locality for species
 †Dolichoderus rohweri – type locality for species
 †Dolichomyia
 †Dolichomyia tertiaria – type locality for species
 †Dolichomyia testea – type locality for species
 Dolurgus
 †Dolurgus pumilus
 †Dombeyopsis
 †Dombeyopsis magnifica
 †Dominickus – type locality for genus
 †Dominickus castnioides – type locality for species
 †Domnina
 †Domnina gradata
 †Domnina thompsoni – or unidentified comparable form
 †Domninoides
 Donacia
 Dorytomus
 †Dorytomus coercitus – type locality for species
 †Dorytomus williamsi – type locality for species
 †Doxocopa
 †Doxocopa wilmattae – type locality for species
 †Drassonax
 †Drassonax harpagops – type locality for species
 †Drepanomeryx – tentative report
 †Drepanomeryx falciformis
   †Dromomeryx
 †Dromomeryx borealis – type locality for species
 †Dryobius
 †Dryobius miocenicus – type locality for species
 Dryocoetes – type locality for genus
 †Dryocoetes diluvialis – type locality for species
Dryopteris
 †Dryopteris guyottii
 †Dryopteris lakesi
 †Dryopteris serrata
 Dyschirius
 †Dyscoletes
 †Dyscoletes soporatus – type locality for species
 †Dysdercus
 †Dysdercus cinctus – type locality for species
 †Dysdercus unicolor – type locality for species
 †Dyspetochrysa
 †Dyspetochrysa vetuscula – type locality for species

E

 †Earinus
 †Earinus saxatilis – type locality for species
 †Ecclesimus
 †Ecclesimus tenuiceps
 †Echinaphis – type locality for genus
 †Echinaphis rohweri – type locality for species
   †Echmatemys
 †Echmatemys lativertebralis – or unidentified comparable form
 †Echmatemys septaria
 †Echmatemys stevensoniana – tentative report
 †Ectobius
 †Ectobius kohlsi – type locality for species
 †Ectocion
 †Ectocion major
 †Ectocion medituber
 †Ectocion osbornianus
 †Ectocion parvus
 †Ectoconus
 †Ectoconus ditrigonus
 †Ectoganus
 †Ectoganus lobdelli
 †Ectopria
 †Ectopria laticollis – type locality for species
 †Ectypodus
 †Ectypodus childei – or unidentified comparable form
 †Ectypodus musculus – type locality for species
 †Ectypodus tardus
 †Elaeomyrmex – type locality for genus
 †Elaeomyrmex coloradensis – type locality for species
 †Elaeomyrmex gracilis – type locality for species
 †Elaphidion
 †Elaphidion fracticorne – type locality for species
 Elaphropus
 †Elaphropus incurvus
 †Elater
 †Elater florissantensis – type locality for species
 †Elater rohweri – type locality for species
 †Elater scudderi – type locality for species
Eleodes
 †Eleodes granulatus – or unidentified comparable form
 †Elidiptera
 †Elidiptera regularis – type locality for species
 †Emiliana – type locality for genus
 †Emiliana alexandri – type locality for species
   †Empis
 †Empis florissantana – type locality for species
 †Empis infossa – type locality for species
 †Empis miocenica – type locality for species
 †Empis perdita – type locality for species
 †Enallagma
 †Enallagma florissantella – type locality for species
 †Enallagma mortuella – type locality for species
 †Enallagma oblisum – type locality for species
 Engelhardtia
 †Engelhardtia uintaensis – type locality for species
Enochrus
 †Enochrus hamiltoni
 †Enochrus scudderi – type locality for species
 †Entimus
 †Entimus primordialis – type locality for species
   †Eobasileus
 †Eobasileus cornutus
 †Eobruneria – type locality for genus
 †Eobruneria tessellata – type locality for species
 †Eobumbatrix
 †Eobumbatrix latebrosa – type locality for species
 †Eocleonus – type locality for genus
 †Eocleonus subjectus – type locality for species
 †Eocuculus – type locality for genus
 †Eocuculus cherpinae – type locality for species
 †Eodiplurina – type locality for genus
 †Eodiplurina cockerelli – type locality for species
 †Eoerianthus – type locality for genus
 †Eoerianthus eocaenicus – type locality for species
 †Eoerianthus multispinosa – type locality for species
 †Eoformica – type locality for genus
 †Eoformica globularis – type locality for species
 †Eoformica magna – type locality for species
 †Eoformica pinguis – type locality for species
 †Eofulgorella – type locality for genus
 †Eofulgorella bradburyi – type locality for species
 †Eoglyptosaurus
 †Eoglyptosaurus donohoei
 †Eogryllus
 †Eogryllus elongatus – type locality for species
 †Eogryllus unicolor – type locality for species
 †Eohemichroa
 †Eohemichroa eophila – type locality for species
     †Eohippus
 †Eohippus angustidens
 †Eolestes – type locality for genus
 †Eolestes syntheticus – type locality for species
 †Eoliarus – type locality for genus
 †Eoliarus quadristictus – type locality for species
 †Eomerope – type locality for genus
 †Eomerope tortriciformis – type locality for species
 †Eomogoplistes – type locality for genus
 †Eomogoplistes longipennis – type locality for species
 †Eomyza – type locality for genus
 †Eomyza holoptera – type locality for species
 †Eopachylosticta
 †Eopachylosticta byrami – type locality for species
 †Eophlebomyia – type locality for genus
 †Eophlebomyia claripennis – type locality for species
 †Eopimpla – type locality for genus
 †Eopimpla grandis – type locality for species
 †Eosacantha – type locality for genus
 †Eosacantha delocranioides – type locality for species
 †Eostentatrix
 †Eostentatrix cockerelli – type locality for species
 †Eostentatrix ostentata – type locality for species
 †Eotetrix – type locality for genus
 †Eotetrix unicornis – type locality for species
 †Eothes – type locality for genus
 †Eothes elegans – type locality for species
 †Eotingis – type locality for genus
 †Eotingis antennata – type locality for species
   †Eotitanops
 †Eotitanops borealis
 †Eotrella – type locality for genus
 †Eotrella mira – type locality for species
 †Eotylopus
 †Eozacla
 †Eozacla arachnomorpha – type locality for species
 †Eozacla problematica – type locality for species
 †Epallagites – type locality for genus
 †Epallagites avus – type locality for species
 †Epanuraea – type locality for genus
 †Epanuraea ingenita – type locality for species
 †Ephalus
 †Ephalus adumbratus – type locality for species
   Ephedra
 †Ephedra miocenica
 †Ephemera
 †Ephemera exsucca – type locality for species
 †Ephemera howarthi – type locality for species
 †Ephemera immobilis – type locality for species
 †Ephemera interempta – type locality for species
 †Ephemera macilenta – type locality for species
 †Ephemera pumicosa – type locality for species
 †Ephemera tabifica – type locality for species
 †Epicaerus
 †Epicaerus effossus
 †Epicaerus eradicatus
 †Epicaerus evigoratus
 †Epicaerus exanimis
 †Epicaerus excissus – type locality for species
 †Epicaerus saxatilis
 †Epicaerus subterraneus
 †Epicaerus terrosus
Epicauta
 †Epicauta subneglecta – type locality for species
   †Epicyon
 †Epicyon haydeni
 †Epihippus
 †Epihippus gracilis
 †Epiphloeus
 †Epiphloeus pristinus – type locality for species
 Epuraea
 †Epuraea planulata
 †Epyris
 †Epyris deletus – type locality for species
 †Equisetum
 †Equisetum florissantense
 †Equisetum winchesteri
 Equus
   †Equus conversidens
 †Equus francisci
   †Equus scotti – or unidentified comparable form
   †Equus simplicidens
 Eremophila
 †Eremophila alpestris
 Erethizon
 Eriocampa
 †Eriocampa bruesi – type locality for species
 †Eriocampa celata – type locality for species
 †Eriocampa disjecta – type locality for species
 †Eriocampa pristina – type locality for species
 †Eriocampa scudderi – type locality for species
 †Eriocampa synthetica – type locality for species
 †Eriophyes – tentative report
 †Eriophyes beutenmulleri
 †Eristalis
 †Eristalis lapideus – type locality for species
 †Ernobius
 †Ernobius effetus – type locality for species
 †Erycus
 †Erycus brevicollis – type locality for species
 †Esthonyx
 †Esthonyx acutidens
 †Esthonyx bisulcatus
 †Esthonyx spatularius
 †Eterochalcis
 †Eterochalcis scudderi – type locality for species
   †Ethmia
 †Ethmia mortuella – type locality for species
 †Etirocoris – type locality for genus
 †Etirocoris infernalis – type locality for species
 †Eubazus
 †Eubazus wilmattae – type locality for species
 †Eucallimyia
 †Eucallimyia fortis – type locality for species
 †Eucicones
 †Eucicones oblongopunctata – type locality for species
 Eucnecosum
 †Eucnecosum brachypterum
 †Eucnecosum brunnescens
 †Eucnecosum tenue
 †Eucnemis
 †Eucnemis antiquatus – type locality for species
   †Eucommia
 †Eucommia serrata
 †Eucorites – type locality for genus
 †Eucorites serescens – type locality for species
 †Eudasytites – type locality for genus
 †Eudasytites listriformis – type locality for species
 †Eudomus
 †Eudomus pinguis
 †Eudomus robustus
Eugenia
 †Eugenia americana
 †Eugenia arenaceaeformis
 †Eugnamptidea – type locality for genus
 †Eugnamptidea florissantensis – type locality for species
 †Eugnamptidea robusta – type locality for species
 †Eugnamptidea tertiaria – type locality for species
 †Eulithomyrmex – type locality for genus
  †Eulithomyrmex rugosus – type locality for species
 †Eulithomyrmex striatus – type locality for species
 †Eumys
 †Eumys brachyodus
 †Eumys elegans
 †Euparius
 †Euparius adumbratus – type locality for species
 †Euparius arcessitus – type locality for species
Euphorbia
 †Euphorbia minuta
 †Euphorus
 †Euphorus indurescens – type locality for species
 †Eurhinus
 †Eurhinus occultus – type locality for species
 †Euroxenomys
 †Eurytoma
 †Eurytoma sepulta – type locality for species
 †Eurytoma sequax – type locality for species
 Eutamias
   †Eutamias minimus – or unidentified comparable form
 †Eutrichopleurus
 †Eutrichopleurus miocenus – type locality for species
 †Eutypomys
 †Eutypomys parvus
 †Evopes
 †Evopes occubatus – type locality for species
 †Evopes veneratus – type locality for species
 Exechia
 †Exechia priscula – type locality for species
 †Exenterus
 †Exenterus dormitans – type locality for species
 †Exetastes
 †Exetastes inveteratus – type locality for species
 †Exitelus – type locality for genus
 †Exitelus exsanguis – type locality for species
 †Exochilum
 †Exochilum inusitatum – type locality for species
 †Exochus
 †Exochus captus – type locality for species
 †Exostinus – type locality for genus
 †Exostinus serratus – type locality for species

F

 †Fagopsis
 †Fagopsis longifolia
 Falcipennis
 †Falcipennis canadenis
 Falco
  †Falco sparverius
 †Fenusa – type locality for genus
 †Fenusa parvus – type locality for species
 †Fenusa primula – type locality for species
 †Fibla
 †Fibla exusta – type locality for species
 Ficus
 †Ficus affinis
 †Ficus artocarpoides
 †Ficus bruesi
 †Ficus florissantella
 †Ficus florissantia
 †Ficus minutidens
 †Ficus planicostata
 †Ficus subtruncata
 †Ficus uncata
 †Figites
 †Figites solus – type locality for species
 †Florimena – type locality for genus
 †Florimena impressa – type locality for species
 †Floriscolia – type locality for genus
 †Floriscolia relicta – type locality for species
 †Florissantia (planthopper) – type locality for genus
 †Florissantia elegans – type locality for species
  †Florissantia (plant) – type locality for genus
 †Florissantia speirii
 †Florissantinus – type locality for genus
 †Florissantinus angulatus – type locality for species
 †Florissantoraphidia
 †Florissantoraphidia funerata – type locality for species
 †Florissantoraphidia mortua – type locality for species
 > Formica
 †Formica cockerelli – type locality for species
 †Formica grandis – type locality for species
 †Formica neorufibarbis
 †Formica robusta – type locality for species
 †Fornax
 †Fornax relictus – type locality for species
 †Frangulops – type locality for genus
 †Frangulops pseudostenophylla – type locality for species. Formerly known as Ilex pseudostenophylla.
 †Franimys – tentative report
 †Fraxinus
 †Fraxinus eocenica
 Fulgora
 †Fulgora obticescens – type locality for species
 Fulica
  Fulica americana
 †Fuscus – tentative report
 †Fuscus faecatus – type locality for species

G

 †Galesimorpha
 †Galesimorpha wheeleri – type locality for species
 †Gastrallanobium – type locality for genus
 †Gastrallanobium subconfusum – type locality for species
 †Gaurotes
 †Gaurotes striatopunctatus – type locality for species
 †Gelastops
 †Gelastops parcus
 †Geocoris
 †Geocoris infernorum – type locality for species
 Geodromicus
 †Geodromicus abditus – type locality for species
 Geomys
   †Geomys bursarius
 †Geotiphia – type locality for genus
 †Geotiphia foxiana – type locality for species
 †Geotiphia halictina – type locality for species
 †Geotiphia pachysoma – type locality for species
 †Geotiphia sternbergi – type locality for species
 †Geralophus
 †Geralophus antiquarius
 †Geralophus discessus – type locality for species
 †Geralophus fossicius
 †Geralophus lassatus
 †Geralophus occultus
 †Geralophus pumiceus – type locality for species
 †Geralophus repositus
 †Geralophus retritus – type locality for species
 †Geralophus saxuosus – type locality for species
 †Geralophus scudderi – type locality for species
 †Geranchon – type locality for genus
 †Geranchon davisii – type locality for species
 †Geron – tentative report
 †Geron platysoma – type locality for species
 †Geroncolabis
 †Geroncolabis commixta – type locality for species
 †Geroncolabis tertiaria – type locality for species
Gerris
 †Gerris protobates – type locality for species
   †Gigantocamelus
 †Glossina – type locality for genus
 †Glossina oligocenus – type locality for species
 †Glossina osborni – type locality for species
 †Glypta
 †Glypta aurora – type locality for species
 †Glyptosaurus
 †Glyptosaurus sylvestris
 †Glyptostrobu
 †Glyptostrobu nordenskioldi
Glyptostrobus
 †Glyptostrobus nordenskioldi
 †Gnathium
 †Gnathium aetatis – type locality for species
 Gnophomyia
 †Gnophomyia seiverti – type locality for species
 †Gomphocerus
 †Gomphocerus abstrusus – type locality for species
   †Gomphotherium
 †Gomphotherium obscurum
 †Gonodera
 †Gonodera antiqua – type locality for species
 †Gonodera vulcanica – type locality for species
 †Gorytes
 †Gorytes archoryctes – type locality for species
 †Grammoptera
 †Grammoptera nanella – type locality for species
 †Gregorymys
 †Gregorymys larsoni
 †Gryllacris
 †Gryllacris cineris – type locality for species
 †Gryllacris mutilata – type locality for species
  †Gyaclavator – type locality for genus
 †Gyaclavator kohlsi – type locality for species
 †Gymnetron
 †Gymnetron antecurrens – type locality for species
 †Gymnopternus
 †Gymnopternus lacustris – type locality for species
 †Gymnorhinus
 †Gymnorhinus cyanocephatus
 †Gypona
 †Gypona cinercia – type locality for species
 †Gyrophaena
 †Gyrophaena saxicola – type locality for species

H

 †Hadrianus
 †Hadrianus corsoni
 †Hadronema
 †Hadronema cinerescens – type locality for species
Halesia
 †Halesia reticulata
 †Hammapteryx
 †Hammapteryx ceryniiformis – type locality for species
 †Hammapteryx lepidoides – type locality for species
 †Hammapteryx tripunctata – type locality for species
   †Hapalodectes
 †Hapalodectes leptognathus – or unidentified comparable form
 †Haplaletes
 †Haplaletes pelicatus
 †Haploconus
 †Haploconus entoconus – or unidentified comparable form
 †Haplolambda
 †Haplolambda quinni
 †Haplomylus
 †Haplomylus simpsoni
 †Haplomylus speirianus
 Harpalus
 †Harpalus maceratus – type locality for species
 †Harpalus nuperus – type locality for species
 †Harpalus redivivus – type locality for species
 †Harpalus ulomaeformis – type locality for species
 †Harpalus veterum – type locality for species
 †Harpalus whitfieldii
 †Harrymys
 †Heeria – type locality for genus
 †Heeria foeda – type locality for species
 †Heeria gulosa – type locality for species
 †Heeria lapidosa – type locality for species
 †Helaletes
 †Helaletes nanus – or unidentified comparable form
 †Helichus
 †Helichus eruptus – type locality for species
 †Helichus tenuior – type locality for species
 †Heliscomys
 †Heliscomys vetus
 †Hellwigia
 †Hellwigia obsoleta – type locality for species
Helophorus
 †Helophorus auricollis
 †Helophorus eclectus
 †Hemiacodon
   †Hemiauchenia
 †Hemiauchenia macrocephala
 †Hemiteles
 †Hemiteles lapidescens – type locality for species
 †Hemiteles obtectus – type locality for species
 †Hemiteles priscus – type locality for species
 †Hemiteles veternus – type locality for species
 †Heptacodon
 †Heptodon
 †Heptodon calciculus
 †Heptodon posticus
 †Heriades
 †Heriades bowditchi – type locality for species
 †Heriades halictinus – type locality for species
 †Heriades laminarum – type locality for species
 †Heriades mersatus – type locality for species
 †Heriades mildredae – type locality for species
 †Heriades priscus – type locality for species
 †Heriades saxosus – type locality for species
 †Herpetotherium
 †Herpetotherium fugax
 †Herpetotherium innominatum
 †Herpetotherium knighti
 Hersiliola
 †Hesperagrion
 †Hesperagrion praevolans – type locality for species
 †Hesperhys
   †Hesperocyon
 †Hesperocyon coloradensis
 †Hesperocyon gregarius
 †Hesperolagomys
 Heterodon
   †Heterodon nasicus
 †Heteromyza
 †Heteromyza detecta – type locality for species
 †Heteromyza miocenica – type locality for species
 †Heterothops
 †Heterothops conticens – type locality for species
 †Hexacodus
 †Hexacodus pelodes
 †Hexerites – type locality for genus
 †Hexerites primalis – type locality for species
   †Heyderia
 †Heyderia coloradensis – type locality for species
 †Hiatensor
 †Hiatensor semirutus – type locality for species
 †Hipporhinops – type locality for genus
 †Hipporhinops sternbergi – type locality for species
 †Hirmoneura – type locality for genus
 †Hirmoneura willistoni – type locality for species
 Holbrookia
 †Holbrookia maculata
 †Holcorpa – type locality for genus
 †Holcorpa maculosa – type locality for species
 †Homoeogamia
 †Homoeogamia ventriosa – type locality for species
   †Homogalax
 †Homogalax protapirinus
 †Hoplia
 †Hoplia striatipennis – type locality for species
 †Hoplisidia – type locality for genus
 †Hoplisidia kohliana – type locality for species
 †Hoplocampa
 †Hoplocampa ilicis – type locality for species
 †Hoplochelys
 †Hoplochelys crassa
 †Horistonotus
 †Horistonotus coloradensis – type locality for species
 †Hormorus
 †Hormorus saxorum – type locality for species
 †Humulus
 †Humulus florissantellus
   †Hyaenodon
 †Hyaenodon crucians
 †Hyaenodon horridus
 †Hyaenodon mustelinus
 †Hydnobius
 †Hydnobius tibialis – type locality for species
 Hydraena
 †Hydraena circulata – or unidentified comparable form
Hydrangea
 †Hydrangea antica
 †Hydrangea fraxinifolia
 Hydriomena – tentative report
 †Hydriomena? protrita – type locality for species
 Hydrobius
   †Hydrobius fuscipes
 †Hydrobius maceratus – type locality for species
 †Hydrobius prisconatator – type locality for species
 †Hydrobius titan – type locality for species
 †Hydromystria
 †Hydromystria expansa
 Hydrophilus
 †Hydrophilus extricatus – type locality for species
 Hydroporus
 †Hydroporus sedimentorum – type locality for species
 Hydropsyche
 †Hydropsyche marcens – type locality for species
 †Hydropsyche operta – type locality for species
 †Hydropsyche scudderi – type locality for species
 †Hydroptila
 †Hydroptila phileos – type locality for species
   Hygrotus
 †Hygrotus miocenus – type locality for species
 Hylastes
 †Hylastes americanus – type locality for species
 †Hylastes nigrinus
 †Hylesinus – type locality for genus
 †Hylesinus dormiscens – type locality for species
 †Hylesinus extractus – type locality for species
 †Hylesinus hydropicus – type locality for species
 †Hylobius
 †Hylobius lacoei – type locality for species
 †Hylomeryx
 Hylurgops
 †Hylurgops piger – type locality for species
 †Hymenophyllum
 †Hymenophyllum confusum
 †Hymenorus
 †Hymenorus haydeni – type locality for species
   †Hyopsodus
 †Hyopsodus loomisi
 †Hyopsodus lysitensis
 †Hyopsodus paulus
 †Hyopsodus powellianus
 †Hyopsodus simplex
 †Hyopsodus walcottianus
 †Hyopsodus wortmani
 †Hypertragulus
 †Hypertragulus calcaratus
 †Hypisodus
 †Hypisodus minimus
 Hypnum
 †Hypnum coloradense
 †Hypnum haydenii
 †Hypohippus
 †Hypohippus osborni – type locality for species
 †Hypolagus
 †Hyporhina
 †Hyporhina galbreathi – type locality for species
 †Hyposodus
 †Hyposodus loomisi
 †Hyrachyus
 †Hyrachyus modestus
   †Hyracodon
 †Hyracodon arcidens – type locality for species
 †Hyracodon leidyanus
 †Hyracodon nebraskensis
 †Hyracotherium
 †Hyracotherium vasacciense
 †Hystricops

I

 †Ichneumon
 †Ichneumon alpha – type locality for species
 †Ichneumon concretus – type locality for species
 †Ichneumon decrepitus – type locality for species
 †Ichneumon dormitans – type locality for species
 †Ichneumon exesus – type locality for species
 †Ichneumon obduratus – type locality for species
 †Ichneumon petrinus – type locality for species
 †Ichneumon pollens – type locality for species
 †Ichneumon primigenius – type locality for species
 †Ichneumon provectus – type locality for species
 †Ichneumon somniatus – type locality for species
 †Ichneumon torpefactus – type locality for species
 †Ignacius
 †Ignacius frugivorus
   Ilex
 †Ilex artocarpidioides
 †Ilex knightiaefolia
 †Ilex pseudostenophylla – type locality for species. Later reclassified in the new genus Frangulops.
 †Indusia
 †Indusia cypridis – type locality for species
   †Iridomyrmex
 †Iridomyrmex florissantius – type locality for species
 †Iridomyrmex obscurans – type locality for species
 Ischnoptera
 †Ischnoptera brunneri – type locality for species
     †Ischyromys
 †Ischyromys douglassi – or unidentified comparable form
 †Ischyromys typus
 †Ischyromys veterior – or unidentified comparable form
 †Isectolophus
 †Isectolophus annectens
 †Isoetites
 †Isoetites horridus
 †Isomira
 †Isomira aurora – type locality for species
 †Isomira florissantensis – type locality for species
 †Isothea – type locality for genus
 †Isothea alleni – type locality for species
 †Isotrilophus
 †Isotrilophus rasnitsyni – type locality for species
 †Iulus
 †Iulus florissantellus – type locality for species

J

 †Jadera
 †Jadera interita – type locality for species
 †Janus
 †Janus disperditus – type locality for species
 †Jassopsis – type locality for genus
 †Jassopsis evidens – type locality for species
 Jassus – tentative report. Lapsus calami of Iassus.
 †"Jassus" latebrae – type locality for species
 †Judolia
 †Judolia antecurrens – type locality for species
   Juglans
 †Juglans berryana
 Junco
   †Junco hyemalis
 †Juncus
 †Juncus crassulus
 †Jungermanniopsis
 †Jungermanniopsis cockerellii
 †Jupitellia – type locality for genus
 †Jupitellia charon – type locality for species

K

   †Kalmia
 †Kalmia elliptica
 †Kimbetohia
 †Kimbetohia mziae – type locality for species
 †Knightomys
 †Knightomys depressus
 †Knightomys huerfanensis
Koelreuteria
 †Koelreuteria alleni
 †Kohlsimyrma – type locality for genus
 †Kohlsimyrma gracilis – type locality for species
 †Kohlsimyrma laticeps – type locality for species
 †Kohlsimyrma longiceps – type locality for species
 †Kronolictus – type locality for genus
 †Kronolictus scudderiellus – type locality for species
 †Kronolictus vulcanus – type locality for species

L

 †Laasbium – type locality for genus
 †Laasbium agassizii – type locality for species
 †Laasbium sectile – type locality for species
 †Labandeiraia – type locality for genus
 †Labandeiraia americaborealis – type locality for species
 †Labidolemur
 †Labidolemur kayi
 †Labidolemur serus
 †Labidolemur soricoides – type locality for species
 †Labiduromma
 †Labiduromma avia – type locality for species
 †Labiduromma bormansi – type locality for species
 †Laccopygus – type locality for genus
 †Laccopygus nilesii – type locality for species
 †Lachnopus
 †Lachnopus humatus – type locality for species
 †Lachnopus recuperatus – type locality for species
 †Lacon
 †Lacon exhumatus – type locality for species
   †Lagopus
 †Lagopus leucurus
 †Lambdotherium
 †Lambdotherium popoagicum – type locality for species
 †Lampronota
 †Lampronota pristina – type locality for species
 †Lampronota stygialis – type locality for species
 †Lampronota tenebrosa – type locality for species
 †Lapton
 †Lapton daemon – type locality for species
   Larus
 †Lasiopa
 †Lasiopa carpenteri – type locality for species
Lasiopodomys
 †Lasiopodomys deceitensis
Lasius
 †Lasius peritulus – type locality for species
 †Lastrea
 †Lastrea goldiana
 Lathrobium
 †Lathrobium antediluvianum – type locality for species
 †Laurophyllum
 †Laurophyllum caudatum
 †Laurophyllum perseanum
   Laurus
 †Laurus socialis
 †Lebia
 †Lebia protospiloptera – type locality for species
 †Leguminosites
 †Leguminosites coloradensis
 †Leguminosites lespedezoides – type locality for species
 †Leguminosites lesquereuxiana
 †Leia
 †Leia miocenica – type locality for species
 †Lema
 †Lema evanescens – type locality for species
 †Lema fortior – type locality for species
 †Lema lesquereuxi – type locality for species
 Lemmiscus
 †Lemmiscus curtatus
 †Lepismophlebia
 †Lepismophlebia platymera – type locality for species
   Lepisosteus
 †Leptacinus
 †Leptacinus exsucidus – type locality for species
 †Leptacinus fossus – type locality for species
 †Leptacinus leidyi – type locality for species
 †Leptacinus maclurei – type locality for species
 †Leptacinus rigatus – type locality for species
 †Leptacodon
 †Leptacodon tener – type locality for species
 †Leptarctus
 †Leptarctus primus
 †Leptauchenia
 †Leptauchenia decora
 †Leptauchenia major
 †Leptis
 †Leptis mystaceaeformis – type locality for species
 †Leptobatopsis
 †Leptobatopsis ashmeadii – type locality for species
 †Leptobrochus – type locality for genus
 †Leptobrochus luteus – type locality for species
 †Leptochoerus
 †Leptochoerus spectabilis
   †Leptocyon
 †Leptocyon vafer
 †Leptogaster
 †Leptogaster prior – type locality for species
 †Leptomeryx
 †Leptomeryx esulcatus
 †Leptomeryx evansi
 †Leptomeryx speciosus
 †Leptomorphus
 †Leptomorphus palaeospilus – type locality for species
 Leptophloeus
 †Leptophloeus alternans – or unidentified comparable form
 †Leptostylus
 †Leptostylus scudderi – type locality for species
 †Leptotomus
 †Leptotomus parvus
 †Leptura
 †Leptura petrorum – type locality for species
 †Leptura ponderosissima – type locality for species
 †Leptura wickhami – type locality for species
 Lepus
   †Lepus townsendii
 †Lestomyia
 †Lestomyia miocenica – type locality for species
 †Leucosticte
 †Leucosticte atrata
 †Leucosticte tephrocotis
 †Leucozona
 †Leucozona nigra – type locality for species
 †Libellulapis – type locality for genus
 †Libellulapis antiquorum – type locality for species
 †Libellulapis wilmattae – type locality for species
 †Lichnanthe
 †Lichnanthe defuncta – type locality for species
 †Ligyrocoris
 †Ligyrocoris exsuctus – type locality for species
 †Ligyrus
 †Ligyrus compositus – type locality for species
 †Ligyrus effetus – type locality for species
   †Limnephilus
 †Limnephilus eocenicus – type locality for species
 †Limnerium
 †Limnerium consuetum – type locality for species
 †Limnerium depositum – type locality for species
 †Limnerium plenum – type locality for species
 †Limnerium tectum – type locality for species
 †Limnerium vetustum – type locality for species
 †Limnobium
 †Limnobium obliteratum
 †Limnocema
 †Limnocema lutescens – type locality for species
 †Limnocema marcescens – type locality for species
 †Limnocema mortoni – type locality for species
 †Limnocema sternbergi – type locality for species
 †Limnocema styx – type locality for species
 †Limnoecus
 †Limnoecus compressus
 †Limnophila
 †Limnophila rogersii – type locality for species
 †Limnophila vasta – type locality for species
 †Limnophilus
 †Limnophilus soporatus – type locality for species
 †Limnopsyche – type locality for genus
 †Limnopsyche dispersa – type locality for species
 †Limonius
 †Limonius aboriginalis – type locality for species
 †Limonius florissantensis – type locality for species
 †Limonius praecursor – type locality for species
 †Limonius shoshonis – type locality for species
 †Limonius volans – type locality for species
Lindera
 †Lindera coloradica – type locality for species
 †Lindera obtusata
 †Lindera varifolia – type locality for species
   †Linnaea – type locality for genus
 †Linnaea abolita – type locality for species
 †Linnaea carcerata – type locality for species
 †Linnaea evoluta – type locality for species
 †Linnaea gravida – type locality for species
 †Linnaea holmesii – type locality for species
 †Linnaea putnami – type locality for species
 †Linyphia
 †Linyphia byrami – type locality for species
 †Linyphia florissanti – type locality for species
 †Linyphia pachygnathoides – type locality for species
 †Linyphia retensa – type locality for species
 †Linyphia seclusa – type locality for species
   †Liometopum
 †Liometopum miocenicum – type locality for species
 †Liometopum scudderi – type locality for species
 †Listrochelus
 †Listrochelus puerilis – type locality for species
 †Listroderes
 †Listroderes differens – type locality for species
 †Listroderes evisceratus – type locality for species
 †Lithagrion
 †Lithagrion hyalinum – type locality for species
 †Lithandrena – type locality for genus
 †Lithandrena saxorum – type locality for species
 †Lithanthidium – type locality for genus
 †Lithanthidium pertriste – type locality for species
 †Lithecphora – type locality for genus
 †Lithecphora diaphana – type locality for species
 †Lithecphora murata – type locality for species
 †Lithecphora setigera – type locality for species
 †Lithecphora unicolor – type locality for species
 †Lithembia
 †Lithembia florissantensis – type locality for species
 †Litheuphaea
 †Litheuphaea coloradensis – type locality for species
 †Lithocharis
 †Lithocharis scottii – type locality for species
 †Lithochromus – type locality for genus
 †Lithochromus extraneus – type locality for species
 †Lithochromus gardneri – type locality for species
 †Lithochromus mortuarius – type locality for species
 †Lithochromus obstrictus – type locality for species
 †Lithocicada – type locality for genus
 †Lithocicada perita – type locality for species
 †Lithocoris – type locality for genus
 †Lithocoris evulsus – type locality for species
 †Lithocoryne – type locality for genus
 †Lithocoryne arcuata – type locality for species
 †Lithocoryne coloradensis – type locality for species
 †Lithocoryne gravis – type locality for species
   †Lithodryas – type locality for genus
 †Lithodryas styx – type locality for species
 †Lithogryllites
 †Lithogryllites lutzii – type locality for species
 †Litholabis
 †Litholabis gilberti – type locality for species
 †Lithomacratria – type locality for genus
 †Lithomacratria mirabilis – type locality for species
 †Lithomyza – type locality for genus
 †Lithomyza condita – type locality for species
 †Lithophotina – type locality for genus
 †Lithophotina costalis – type locality for species
 †Lithophotina floccosa – type locality for species
 †Lithophthorus – type locality for genus
 †Lithophthorus rugosicollis – type locality for species
 †Lithopsis
 †Lithopsis delicata – type locality for species
 †Lithopsis dubiosa – type locality for species
 †Lithopsis fimbriata – or unidentified comparable form
 †Lithopsis simillima – type locality for species
 †Lithoserix – type locality for genus
 †Lithoserix williamsi – type locality for species
 †Lithosmylus
 †Lithosmylus columbianus – type locality for species
 †Lithotiphia – type locality for genus
 †Lithotiphia scudderi – type locality for species
 †Lithymnetes – type locality for genus
 †Lithymnetes guttatus – type locality for species
 †Litobrochus – type locality for genus
 †Litobrochus externatus – type locality for species
 †Litomylus
 †Litomylus ishami
 †Locrites – type locality for genus
 †Locrites copei – type locality for species
 †Locrites whitei – type locality for species
 †Locusta
 †Locusta silens – type locality for species
   Lomatia
 †Lomatites
 †Lomatites spinosa
   Longitarsus
 Lontra
   †Lontra canadensis – or unidentified comparable form
 †Lophiparamys
 †Lophiparamys debequensis
 Lordithon
 †Lordithon durabilis – type locality for species
 †Lordithon funditus – type locality for species
 †Lordithon longiceps
 †Lordithon lyelli – type locality for species
 †Lordithon stygis – type locality for species
 †Loveina
 †Loveina zephyri
 †Lowesaurus
 †Lowesaurus matthewi – type locality for species
 †Loxolophus
 †Loxolophus hyattianus
 †Lucanus
 †Lucanus fossilis – type locality for species
 †Lucidota
 †Lucidota prima – type locality for species
 †Ludiophanes – type locality for genus
 †Ludiophanes haydeni – type locality for species
 †Ludius
 †Ludius exanimatus – type locality for species
 †Ludius granulicollis – type locality for species
 †Ludius heeri – type locality for species
 †Ludius laevissimus – type locality for species
 †Ludius primitivus – type locality for species
 †Ludius propheticus – type locality for species
 †Ludius restructus – type locality for species
 †Ludius submersus – type locality for species
 †Luperodes
 †Luperodes submonilis – type locality for species
 †Lutrochites – type locality for genus
 †Lutrochites lecontei – type locality for species
   †Lycosa
 †Lycosa florissanti – type locality for species
 †Lygaeus
 †Lygaeus faeculentus – type locality for species
 †Lygaeus obsolescens – type locality for species
 †Lygaeus stabilitus – type locality for species
Lygodium
 †Lygodium coloradense
 †Lygodium kaulfussi
 Lynx
   †Lynx rufus
Lytta
 †Lytta lithophila – type locality for species

M

 †Macratria
 †Macratria gigantea – type locality for species
  Macrocranion
 †Macrocranion nitens
 †Macrodactylus
 †Macrodactylus pluto – type locality for species
 †Macrodactylus propheticus – type locality for species
 †Macrophya
 †Macrophya pervetusta – type locality for species
 †Macrorhoptus
 †Macrorhoptus intutus – type locality for species
 Magdalis
 †Magdalis lecontei
 †Magdalis sedimentorum – type locality for species
   Magnolia
 †Magnolia berryi
 †Magnolia magnifolia
 †Magnolia regalis
 †Magnolia rotundifolia
 Mahonia
 †Mahonia marginata
 †Mahonia obliqua – type locality for species
 †Mahonia subdenticulata
 †Maiorana
 †Malachius
 †Malachius immurus – type locality for species
 †Malus
 †Malus florissantensis
 †Malus pseudocredneria
 †Mammuthus
   †Mammuthus columbi
 †Manapsis – type locality for genus
 †Manapsis anomala – type locality for species
 Marmota
 †Marmota flaviventris
 †Marquettia
 †Marquettia americana – type locality for species
 Marsilea
 †Marsilea sprungerorum
 Martes
 †Masteutes
 †Masteutes rupis – type locality for species
 †Masteutes saxifer – type locality for species
 †Mataeoschistus – type locality for genus
 †Mataeoschistus limigenus – type locality for species
 †Matthewlabis
 †Matthewlabis cedrensis
 †Mattimys
 †Mecistoneuron – type locality for genus
 †Mecistoneuron perpetuum – type locality for species
 Mecocephala
   †Megacerops
 †Megacerops kuwagatarhinus
 Megachile
 †Megachile praedicta – type locality for species
 †Megacyllene
 †Megacyllene florissantensis – type locality for species
 †Megadelphus
 †Megadelphus lundeliusi
   †Megahippus
 †Megalagus
 †Megalagus brachydon
 †Megalagus brachyodon
 †Megalagus turgidus
 †Megalesthonyx
   †Megalictis
 †Megapenthes
 †Megapenthes primaevus – type locality for species
 †Megaraphidia – type locality for genus
 †Megaraphidia elegans – type locality for species
 †Megaraphidia exhumata – type locality for species
 †Megatryphon – type locality for genus
 †Megatryphon mortiferus – type locality for species
 †Megatylopus
 †Megatylopus gigas – or unidentified comparable form
 †Megaxyela
 †Megaxyela petrefacta – type locality for species
 †Melanactes
 †Melanactes cockerelli – type locality for species
 †Melanagrion
 †Melanagrion nigerrimum – type locality for species
 †Melanagrion umbratum – type locality for species
 †Melanagromyza
 †Melanagromyza prisca – type locality for species
 †Melanagromyza tephrias – type locality for species
 †Melanderella
 †Melanderella glossalis – type locality for species
 †Melanophila
 †Melanophila cockerellae – type locality for species
 †Melanophila handlirschi – type locality for species
 †Melanophila heeri – type locality for species
 Melanthrips
 †Melanthrips extincta – type locality for species
 †Melieria
 †Melieria atavina – type locality for species
 †Melieria calligrapha – type locality for species
 †Melittomma
 †Melittomma lacustrinum – type locality for species
 †Mellinus
 †Mellinus handlirschi – type locality for species
 Melospiza
   †Melospiza lincolnii
 †Meniscotherium
 †Meniscotherium chamense
 †Meniscotherium tapiacitum
   †Menoceras
 †Menoceras barbouri
 Mephitis
 †Mephitis mephitis
 †Meracantha
 †Meracantha lacustris – type locality for species
 †Merychippus
 †Merychippus coloradense
 †Merychippus sejunctus
 †Merychyus
 †Merychyus arenarum
 †Merychyus elegans – type locality for species
 †Merycochoerus
 †Merycochoerus magnus
 †Merycochoerus matthewi
 †Merycodus
 †Merycodus warreni
 †Merycoidodon – type locality for genus
 †Merycoidodon culbertsoni – type locality for species
 †Merycoidodon major
 †Mesatirhinus
 †Mesatirhinus junius
 †Mesobrochus – type locality for genus
 †Mesobrochus imbecillus – type locality for species
 †Mesobrochus lethaeus – type locality for species
 †Mesochorus
 †Mesochorus abolitus – type locality for species
 †Mesochorus aboriginalis – type locality for species
 †Mesochorus carceratus – type locality for species
 †Mesochorus cataclysmi – type locality for species
 †Mesochorus dormitorius – type locality for species
 †Mesochorus lapideus – type locality for species
 †Mesochorus revocatus – type locality for species
 †Mesochorus terrosus – type locality for species
   †Mesocyon
 †Mesocyon temnodon
 †Mesodma
 †Mesodma ambigua
 †Mesodma hensleighi
 †Mesogaulus
 †Mesogaulus paniensis
 †Mesohippus
 †Mesohippus bairdi
 †Mesoleptus
 †Mesoleptus apertus – type locality for species
 †Mesoleptus exstirpatus – type locality for species
 †Mesoneura
 †Mesoneura vexabilis – type locality for species
   †Mesonyx
 †Mesonyx obtusidens
 †Mesopimpla – type locality for genus
 †Mesopimpla sequoiarum – type locality for species
 †Mesostenus
 †Mesostenus modestus – type locality for species
 Messor
 †Messor sculpturatus – type locality for species
   †Metacheiromys
 Metachroma
 †Metachroma florissantensis – type locality for species
 †Metarhinus
 Metasequoia
 †Metasequoia occidentalis
 †Metechinus
 †Metechinus amplior
 †Metoecus
 †Metoecus geikiei – type locality for species
 †Metrobates
 †Metrobates aeternalis – type locality for species
   †Miacis
 †Miacis edax
 †Miacis exiguus
 †Miacis latidens
 †Miacis parvivorus
 †Miacis vorax
 Miagrammopes
 †Mianeuretus – type locality for genus
 †Mianeuretus eocenicus – type locality for species
 †Mianeuretus mirabilis – type locality for species
 †Michenia
 †Microgaster
 †Microgaster primordialis – type locality for species
 †Microplitis
 †Microplitis vesperus – type locality for species
 †Microrhagus
 †Microrhagus fossilis – type locality for species
 †Microrhagus miocenicus – type locality for species
 †Microrhagus vulcanicus – type locality for species
 †Microstylum
 †Microstylum destructum – type locality for species
 †Microstylum wheeleri – type locality for species
 †Microsyops
 †Microsyops angustidens
 †Microsyops annectens
 †Microsyops elegans
 †Microsyops knightensis
 †Microsyops latidens
 †Microsyops scottianus
 †Microtomarctus
 †Microtomarctus conferta
 Microtus
   †Microtus californicus – or unidentified comparable form
   †Microtus longicaudus
 †Microtus meadensis
   †Microtus ochrogaster
 †Microtus paroperarius
 Mictomys
 †Mictomys meltoni
 †Mictomys vetus
 †Mimomys
 †Mimomys virginianus
 †Mimoperadectes
 †Mimoperadectes labrus
 †Mimosites
 †Mimosites coloradensis
 †Mimotricentes
 †Mimotricentes ischyrus – type locality for species
 †Mindarus – type locality for genus
 †Mindarus recurvus – type locality for species
 †Mindarus scudderi – type locality for species
   †Miniochoerus
 †Miniochoerus gracilis
 †Miocaenia – type locality for genus
 †Miocaenia pectinicornis – type locality for species
 †Miocitta – type locality for genus
 †Miocitta galbreathi – type locality for species
 †Miocoris – type locality for genus
 †Miocoris fagi – type locality for species
 †Miocyphon – type locality for genus
 †Miocyphon punctulatus – type locality for species
 †Miodytiscus – type locality for genus
 †Miodytiscus hirtipes – type locality for species
 †Miogeraeus – type locality for genus
 †Miogeraeus recurrens – type locality for species
     †Miohippus
 †Miohippus obliquidens
 †Miolabis
 †Miolabis longiceps
 †Miolachnosterna – type locality for genus
 †Miolachnosterna tristoides – type locality for species
 †Miolithocharis – type locality for genus
 †Miolithocharis lithographica – type locality for species
   †Miomyrmex
 †Miomyrmex impactus – type locality for species
 †Miomyrmex striatus – type locality for species
 †Miophenolia – type locality for genus
 †Miophenolia cilipes – type locality for species
 †Miopodagrion
 †Miopodagrion optimum – type locality for species
 †Miosilpha – type locality for genus
 †Miosilpha necrophiloides – type locality for species
 †Miospermophilus
 †Miospermophilus bryanti
 †Miostenosis – type locality for genus
 †Miostenosis lacordairei – type locality for species
   †Miracinonyx
 †Miracinonyx inexpectatus – or unidentified comparable form
 †Miracinonyx studeri
 †Mischoserphus
 †Mischoserphus bruesi – type locality for species
 †Mitostylus
 †Mitostylus abacus – type locality for species
 †Mitostylus obdurefactus – type locality for species
 †Monocrepidius
 †Monocrepidius dubiosus – type locality for species
 †Monophlebus
 †Monophlebus simplex – type locality for species
 †Monosaulax
 †Monosaulax curtus
   Mordella
 †Mordella atrata – or unidentified comparable form
 †Mordella lapidicola – type locality for species
 †Mordella priscula – type locality for species
 †Mordella stygia – type locality for species
Mordellistena
 †Mordellistena florissantensis – type locality for species
 †Mordellistena nearctica – type locality for species
 †Mordellistena protogaea – type locality for species
 †Mordellistena scudderiana – type locality for species
 †Mordellistena smithiana – type locality for species
     †Moropus
 †Moropus elatus – or unidentified comparable form
 Morus
 †Morus symmetrica
 †Moyamyia – type locality for genus
 †Moyamyia limigena – type locality for species
 Musca
 †Musca vinculata – type locality for species
 Mustela
 †Mustela richardsonii
   †Mustela nigripes
 †Myas
 †Myas rigefactus – type locality for species
 †Myas umbrarum – type locality for species
 †Mycetaulus
 †Mycetaulus incretus – type locality for species
 †Mycetophagus
 †Mycetophagus exterminatus – type locality for species
 †Mycetophagus willistoni – type locality for species
 †Mycetophila
 †Mycetophila bradenae – type locality for species
 †Mycetophila occultata – type locality for species
 Mycetoporus
 †Mycetoporus demersus – type locality for species
 †Mycomya
 †Mycomya cockerelli – type locality for species
 †Mycomya lithomendax – type locality for species
 †Mydas
 †Mydas miocenicus – type locality for species
   Myrica
 †Myrica drymeja
 †Myrmecites – type locality for genus
 †Myrmecites rotundiceps – type locality for species
Myrmica
 †Myrmica lobifrons
 †Myrtophyllum
 †Myrtophyllum torreyi
 †Mystipterus
 †Mystipterus martini
 †Mytonomys
 †Mytonomys coloradensis

N

 †Najadopsis
 †Najadopsis rugulosa
 †Nannodectes
 †Nannodectes gazini
 †Nannodectes gidleyi
 †Nannodectes simpsoni
 †Nanodelphys
 †Nanodelphys hunti
 †Nanthacia
 †Nanthacia torpida – type locality for species
 †Navajovius
 †Navajovius kohlhaasae – type locality for species
   Nebria
 †Nebria occlusa – type locality for species
 †Nebritus
 †Nebritus willistoni – type locality for species
 †Necrobia
 †Necrobia divinatoria – type locality for species
 †Necrobia sibylla – type locality for species
 †Necrochromus – type locality for genus
 †Necrochromus cockerelli – type locality for species
 †Necrochromus labatus – type locality for species
 †Necrochromus saxificus – type locality for species
 †Necrocydnus – type locality for genus
 †Necrocydnus amyzonus – type locality for species
 †Necrocydnus revectus – type locality for species
 †Necrocydnus senior – type locality for species
 †Necrocydnus solidatus – type locality for species
 †Necrocydnus stygius – type locality for species
 †Necrocydnus torpens – type locality for species
 †Necrocydnus vulcanius – type locality for species
 †Necrodes
 †Necrodes primaevus – type locality for species
 †Necropsylla – type locality for genus
 †Necropsylla rigida – type locality for species
 †Necropsylla rigidula – type locality for species
 †Nelumbium
 †Nelumbium tenuifolium
 †Nemognatha
 †Nemognatha exsecta – type locality for species
 Neohypnus
 Neogale
 †Neogale frenata
 †Neogale vison
 †Neoliotomus
 †Neoliotomus conventus
 †Neoliotomus ultimus
 Neoptochus – tentative report
 †Neorhynchocephalus
 †Neorhynchocephalus melanderi – type locality for species
 †Neorhynchocephalus occultator – type locality for species
 †Neorhynchocephalus vulcanicus – type locality for species
 Neotoma
   †Neotoma cinerea
 †Neotoma ozarkensis
 †Nepa
 †Nepa vulcanica – type locality for species
   †Nephila
 †Nephila pennatipes – type locality for species
 †Netelia
 †Netelia memorialis – type locality for species
 †Neurodromicus – type locality for genus
 †Neurodromicus dorsalis – type locality for species
 †Nicocles
 †Nicocles miocenicus – type locality for species
 †Niptomomys
 †Niptomomys doreenae – type locality for species
 Nitidotachinus
 †Nitidotachinus lanei
 Nitidula
 †Nitidula prior – type locality for species
 †Nordenskioldia
 †Nordenskioldia borealis
 †Nortonella – type locality for genus
 †Nortonella typica – type locality for species
 †Nosotetocus – type locality for genus
 †Nosotetocus debilis – type locality for species
 †Nosotetocus marcovi – type locality for species
 †Nosotetocus vespertinus – type locality for species
     †Notharctus
 †Notharctus robinsoni
 †Notharctus robustior
 †Nothopus
 †Nothopus kingii – type locality for species
 †Nothoserphus
 †Nothoserphus rasnitsyni – type locality for species
Notonecta
 †Notonecta binuda – type locality for species
 †Notonecta emersoni – type locality for species
 †Notoparamys
 †Notoparamys arctios – type locality for species
 †Notoparamys costilloi
 Numenius
   †Numenius madagascariensis
 †Numitor – type locality for genus
 †Numitor claviger – type locality for species
 †Nyctea
   †Nyctea scandiaca
 †Nyctitherium
 †Nyctitherium velox – or unidentified comparable form
 †Nyktalos – type locality for genus
 †Nyktalos uhleri – type locality for species
 †Nyktalos vigil – type locality for species
   Nymphaea
 †Nymphaea leei
 †Nymphaea pulchella
 †Nymphalites – type locality for genus
 †Nymphalites obscurus – type locality for species
 †Nymphalites scudderi – type locality for species
Nysius
 †Nysius stratus – type locality for species
 †Nysius terrae – type locality for species
 †Nysius tritus – type locality for species
 †Nysius vecula – type locality for species
 †Nysius vinctus – type locality for species
 †Nyssa
 †Nyssa alata
 †Nyssa obovata

O

 Ochotona
   †Ochotona princeps
 †Ocymoromelitta – type locality for genus
 †Ocymoromelitta florissantella – type locality for species
 †Ocymoromelitta miocenica – type locality for species
 †Ocymoromelitta sorella – type locality for species
 †Odaxosaurus – or unidentified comparable form
 †Odaxosaurus piger
 Odocoileus
   †Odocoileus hemionus
 †Odynerus
 †Odynerus palaeophilus – type locality for species
 †Odynerus percontusus – type locality for species
 †Odynerus praesepultus – type locality for species
 †Odynerus terryi – type locality for species
 †Odynerus wilmattae – type locality for species
 †Oedipoda
 †Oedipoda praefocata – type locality for species
 †Ogygoptynx – type locality for genus
 †Ogygoptynx wetmorei – type locality for species
 †Olbiogaster
 †Olbiogaster simplex – type locality for species
 †Oligaeschna
 †Oligaeschna lapidaria – type locality for species
 †Oligaeschna separata – type locality for species
 †Oligoaeschna – type locality for genus
 †Oligoaeschna needhami – type locality for species
 †Oligobruchus
 †Oligobruchus florissantensis – type locality for species
 †Oligobruchus haywardi – type locality for species
 †Oligobruchus primoticus – type locality for species
 †Oligobruchus scudderi – type locality for species
 †Oligobruchus submersus – type locality for species
 †Oligobruchus wilsoni – type locality for species
 †Oligocryptus – type locality for genus
 †Oligocryptus sectus – type locality for species
 †Oligodonta – type locality for genus
 †Oligodonta florissantensis – type locality for species
   †Oligomerus
 †Oligomerus breviusculus – type locality for species
 †Oligomerus duratus – type locality for species
 †Oligomerus florissantensis – type locality for species
 †Oligomyotis
 †Oligomyotis casementi
 †Oligoneuroides – type locality for genus
 †Oligoneuroides destructus – type locality for species
 †Oligoryctes
 †Oligoscalops
 †Oligoscalops galbreathi
 †Oligotricha
 †Oligotricha evanescens – type locality for species
 †Ologlyptus
 †Ologlyptus primus – type locality for species
 Olophrum
 †Olophrum boreale
 †Olophrum obtectum
 Omalium
 †Omalium antiquorum – type locality for species
 †Omileus
 †Omileus evanidus – type locality for species
 †Omomys
 †Omomys carteri
 Omus
 †Omus audouini
   Ondatra
 †Ondatra annectens
 †Oodectes
 †Oodectes herpestoides
   Ophisaurus
 Ophryastes
 †Ophryastes championi
 †Ophryastes grandis – type locality for species
 †Ophryastes petrarum
 †Ophryastites
 †Ophryastites absconsus – type locality for species
 †Ophryastites cinereus – type locality for species
 †Ophryastites dispertitus – type locality for species
 †Ophryastites hendersoni – type locality for species
 †Ophryastites miocenus – type locality for species
 †Ophyra
 †Ophyra vetusta – type locality for species
 †Opisthotriton
 †Opisthotriton kayi – or unidentified comparable form
 †Orchelimum
 †Orchelimum placidum – type locality for species
 Orchestes
 †Orchestes languidulus – type locality for species
 Oreamnos – or unidentified comparable form
   †Oreamnos harringtoni
 †Oreolagus
 †Oreolagus wilsoni – type locality for species
 †Oreopanax
 †Oreopanax dissecta
 †Oreopanax elongatum – type locality for species
 †Oreotalpa – type locality for genus
 †Oreotalpa florissantensis – type locality for species
 †Ormyrodes
 †Ormyrodes petrefactus – type locality for species
 †Orohippus
 †Orohippus sylvaticus
 †Oromeryx
   †Orontium
 †Orontium fossile
 †Orphilus
 †Orphilus dubius
 †Orthocentrus
 †Orthocentrus defossus – type locality for species
 †Orthocentrus primus – type locality for species
 †Orthriocorisa – type locality for genus
 †Orthriocorisa longipes – type locality for species
 †Oryctogma – type locality for genus
 †Oryctogma sackenii – type locality for species
 †Oryctorhinus – type locality for genus
 †Oryctorhinus tenuirostris – type locality for species
 †Oryctoscirtetes – type locality for genus
 †Oryctoscirtetes protogaeum – type locality for species
 †Osmanthus
 †Osmanthus praemissa
   †Osmunda
 †Osmunda greenlandica
 †Osmylidia
 †Osmylidia requieta – type locality for species
 †Otiorhynchites
 †Otiorhynchites absentivus – type locality for species
 †Otiorhynchites commutatus – type locality for species
 †Otiorhynchites florissantensis – type locality for species
 †Otiorhynchites tysoni
 †Otiorhynchus
 †Otiorhynchus flaccus – type locality for species
 †Otiorhynchus subteractus – type locality for species
 Ovis
   †Ovis canadensis
 †Oxyacodon
 †Oxyacodon archibaldi – type locality for species
   †Oxyaena
 †Oxyaena forcipata
 †Oxyaena gulo
 †Oxyaena intermedia
 †Oxyaena lupina – or unidentified comparable form
 †Oxyaena pardalis – or unidentified comparable form
 †Oxycera
 †Oxycera contusa – type locality for species
 †Oxyclaenus
 †Oxyclaenus cuspidatus – or unidentified comparable form
 †Oxyclaenus subbituminus – type locality for species
 †Oxygonus
 †Oxygonus primus – type locality for species
 †Oxyomus
 †Oxyomus nearcticus – type locality for species
 †Oxyprimus
 †Oxyprimus galadrielae – or unidentified comparable form
 †Oxyserphus
 †Oxyserphus exhumatus – type locality for species
 Oxytelus
 †Oxytelus laqueatus
 †Oxytelus pristinus – type locality for species
 †Oxytelus subapterus – type locality for species

P

   †Pachyaena
 †Pachyaena ossifraga – tentative report
 †Pachybaris
 †Pachybaris rudis – type locality for species
 †Pachylobius
 †Pachylobius compressus
 †Pachylobius depraedatus – type locality for species
 †Pachysomites – type locality for genus
 †Pachysomites inermis – type locality for species
 †Pachysystropus – type locality for genus
 †Pachysystropus condemnatus – type locality for species
 †Pachysystropus rohweri – type locality for species
 †Pactopus
 †Pactopus americanus – type locality for species
   †Paederus
 †Paederus adumbratus – type locality for species
 †Paladicella – type locality for genus
 †Paladicella eruptionis – type locality for species
 †Palaeictops
 †Palaeictops bicuspis
 †Palaeictops multicuspis
 †Palaeobittacus – type locality for genus
 †Palaeobittacus eocenicus – type locality for species
 †Palaeochrysa – type locality for genus
 †Palaeochrysa concinnula – type locality for species
 †Palaeochrysa stricta – type locality for species
 †Palaeochrysa wickhami – type locality for species
 †Palaeocrex – type locality for genus
 †Palaeocrex fax – type locality for species
 †Palaeodrassus
 †Palaeodrassus cockerelli – type locality for species
 †Palaeodrassus florissanti – type locality for species
 †Palaeodrassus hesternus
 †Palaeodrassus interitus – type locality for species
   †Palaeogale
 †Palaeogale sectoria
 †Palaeogyps – type locality for genus
 †Palaeogyps prodromus – type locality for species
 †Palaeolagus
 †Palaeolagus burkei – type locality for species
 †Palaeolagus haydeni
 †Palaeolagus intermedius
 †Palaeometa
 †Palaeometa opertanea – type locality for species
 †Palaeonanophyes – type locality for genus
 †Palaeonanophyes zherikhini – type locality for species
   †Palaeonictis
 †Palaeonictis occidentalis
 †Palaeopachygnatha – type locality for genus
 †Palaeopachygnatha cockerelli – type locality for species
 †Palaeopachygnatha scudderi – type locality for species
 †Palaeopherocera
 †Palaeopherocera scudderi – type locality for species
 †Palaeoplatyura
 †Palaeoplatyura eocenica – type locality for species
 †Palaeopotamogeton
 †Palaeopotamogeton florissanti
 †Palaeorehnia – type locality for genus
 †Palaeorehnia maculata – type locality for species
 †Palaeoscincosaurus – type locality for genus
 †Palaeoscincosaurus middletoni – type locality for species
 †Palaeosinopa
 †Palaeosinopa incerta
 †Palaeosmodicum – type locality for genus
 †Palaeosmodicum hamiltoni – type locality for species
 †Palaeospiza
 †Palaeospiza bella
  †Palaeosyops – type locality for genus
 †Palaeosyops fontinalis – type locality for species
 †Palaeotaxonus – type locality for genus
 †Palaeotaxonus trivittatus – type locality for species
 †Palaeotaxonus typicus – type locality for species
 †Palaeotaxonus vetus – type locality for species
 †Palaeoteleia – type locality for genus
 †Palaeoteleia oxyura – type locality for species
 †Palaeotorymus
 †Palaeotorymus aciculatus – type locality for species
 †Palaeotorymus laevis – type locality for species
 †Palaeotorymus striatus – type locality for species
 †Palaeotorymus typicus – type locality for species
 †Palaeovelia – type locality for genus
 †Palaeovelia spinosa – type locality for species
   †Palaeovespa – type locality for genus
 †Palaeovespa florissantia – type locality for species
 †Palaeovespa gillettei – type locality for species
 †Palaeovespa relecta – type locality for species
 †Palaeovespa scudderi – type locality for species
 †Palaeovespa wilsoni – type locality for species
 †Palaphrodes – type locality for genus
 †Palaphrodes cincta – type locality for species
 †Palaphrodes irregularis – type locality for species
 †Palaphrodes obliqua – type locality for species
 †Palaphrodes obscura – type locality for species
 †Palaphrodes transversa – type locality for species
 †Palatobaena
 †Palatobaena bairdi
 †Palecphora – type locality for genus
 †Palecphora communis – type locality for species
 †Palecphora inornata – type locality for species
 †Palecphora maculata – type locality for species
 †Palecphora marvinei – type locality for species
 †Palecphora praevalens – type locality for species
 †Paleocarcinophora
 †Paleocarcinophora lithophila – type locality for species
 †Paleoclinolabus
 †Paleoclinolabus dormitus – type locality for species
 †Palmites
 †Palmocarpon
 †Palmocarpon commune
 †Palmocarpon compositum
 †Palmocarpon lineatum
 †Palmocarpon subcylindricum
 †Palmocarpon truncatum
 †Paloedemera – type locality for genus
 †Paloedemera crassipes – type locality for species
 †Paloreodoxites
 †Paloreodoxites plicatus
 †Paltorhynchus
 †Paltorhynchus bisulcatus – type locality for species
 †Paltorhynchus depratus
 †Paltorhynchus narwhal
 †Paltorhynchus rectirostris – type locality for species
 †Paltorhynchus sedatus – type locality for species
 †Panax
 †Panax andrewsii
 †Pandeleteinus
 †Pandeleteinus nudus – type locality for species
   †Panorpa
 †Panorpa arctiiformis – type locality for species
 †Panorpa rigida – type locality for species
 †Pantoclis
 †Pantoclis deperdita – type locality for species
 †Pantolestes
 †Pantolestes natans
 †Paracarpinus
 †Paracarpinus fraterna
 Paracosmus – type locality for genus
 †Paracosmus antiquus – type locality for species
 †Paracosmus coquilletti – type locality for species
 †Paracosmus palpalis – type locality for species
 †Paracosmus recurrens – type locality for species
 †Paracosoryx
 †Paracynarctus
 †Paracynarctus kelloggi
 †Paradjidaumo
 †Paradjidaumo trilophus
 †Paraglyptosaurus
 †Paraglyptosaurus princeps – type locality for species
 †Parahippus
 †Parahippus leonensis – or unidentified comparable form
 †Parahippus pawniensis – type locality for species
 †Parajulus
 †Parajulus cockerelli – type locality for species
     †Paramylodon
 †Paramylodon harlani
 †Paramys
 †Paramys copei
 †Paramys excavatus
 †Paramys relictus
 †Paramys taurus
 †Parandra
 †Parandra florissantensis – type locality for species
 †Parattus – type locality for genus
 †Parattus evocatus – type locality for species
 †Parattus latitatus – type locality for species
 †Parattus oculatus – type locality for species
 †Parattus resurrectus – type locality for species
     †Paratylopus
 †Paratylopus labiatus
 †Parectypodus
 †Parectypodus lunatus
 †Parictis
 †Parictis dakotensis
 †Parodarmistus – type locality for genus
 †Parodarmistus abscissus – type locality for species
 †Parodarmistus caducus – type locality for species
 †Parodarmistus collisus – type locality for species
 †Parodarmistus defectus – type locality for species
 †Parodarmistus exanimatus – type locality for species
 †Parodarmistus inhibitus – type locality for species
 †Parolamia – type locality for genus
 †Parolamia rudis – type locality for species
 †Parophisaurus – type locality for genus
 †Parophisaurus pawneensis – type locality for species
 †Parotermes – type locality for genus
 †Parotermes insignis – type locality for species
 †Parthenocissus
 †Parthenocissus osbornii
 †Parvericius
 †Parvericius montanus
 †Passaloecus
 †Passaloecus fasciatus – type locality for species
 †Passaloecus scudderi – type locality for species
  †Patriofelis
 †Patriofelis ulta
 †Paussopsis – type locality for genus
 †Paussopsis nearctica – type locality for species
 †Paussopsis secunda – type locality for species
 Pediacus
 †Pediacus periclitans – type locality for species
Pekania
 †Pekania diluviana
 †Pelandrena – type locality for genus
 †Pelandrena reducta – type locality for species
 †Pellea
 †Pellea antiquella
 †Peltis
 †Peltis laminata – type locality for species
   †Peltosaurus
 †Peltosaurus granulosus – type locality for species
 †Pelycodus
 †Pelycodus danielsae
 †Pelycodus jarrovii
 †Pelycomys
 †Pelycomys placidus
 †Pelycomys rugosus
 †Penetrigonias
 †Penetrigonias dakotensis
 †Penosphyllum
 †Penosphyllum cordatum
 †Pentatomites – type locality for genus
 †Pentatomites foliarum – type locality for species
   Penthetria – type locality for genus
 †Penthetria creedensis – type locality for species
 †Penthetria immutabilis – type locality for species
 †Penthetria intermedia – type locality for species
 †Penthetria longifurca – type locality for species
 †Pepsis
 †Pepsis avitula – type locality for species
 †Peraceras
 †Peraceras profectum
 †Peraceras superciliosum
 †Peradectes
 †Peradectes elegans – type locality for species
 †Peradectes protinnominatus – type locality for species
   †Peratherium
 †Peratherium comstocki – or unidentified comparable form
 †Perchoerus
 †Perchoerus nanus
 †Periptychus
 †Periptychus coarctatus
 Peromyscus
 †Peromyscus cragini
 †Peromyscus maniculatus
 †Peromyscus progressus
Persea
 †Persea brossiana
 †Persea florissantia – type locality for species
   †Petraeomyrmex – type locality for genus
 †Petraeomyrmex minimus – type locality for species
 †Petrolabis
 †Petrolabis gurneyi – type locality for species
 †Petrolestes – type locality for genus
 †Petrolestes hendersoni – type locality for species
 †Petrolystra – type locality for genus
 †Petrolystra gigantea – type locality for species
 †Petrolystra heros – type locality for species
 †Petrunkevitchiana
 †Petrunkevitchiana oculata – type locality for species
 †Phaca
 †Phaca wilmattae
Phalacrocorax
 †Phalacrocorax mediterraneus
 Phalaropus
   †Phalaropus lobatus
 †Phaseolites
 †Phaseolites dedal – type locality for species
 †Phasmagyps – type locality for genus
 †Phasmagyps patritus – type locality for species
 Pheidole
 †Pheidole tertiaria – type locality for species
 †Phenacodaptes
 †Phenacodaptes sabulosus
   †Phenacodus
 †Phenacodus grangeri
 †Phenacodus intermedius
 †Phenacodus magnus
 †Phenacodus vortmani
 †Phenacolestes – type locality for genus
 †Phenacolestes mirandus – type locality for species
 †Phenacolestes parallelus – type locality for species
 Phenacomys
 †Phenacomys deeringensis
 †Phenacomys gryci – or unidentified comparable form
 †Phenacomys intermedius
 †Phenacoperga
 †Phenacoperga coloradensis – type locality for species
 †Phenacopsyche – type locality for genus
 †Phenacopsyche larvalis – type locality for species
 †Phenacopsyche vexans – type locality for species
 †Phenanthera
 †Phenanthera petalifera
   Philadelphus
 †Philadelphus minutus – type locality for species
 †Philanthus
 †Philanthus saxigenus – type locality for species
 Philhydrus
 †Philhydrus scudderi
 †Philonicus
 †Philonicus saxorum – type locality for species
 Philonthus
 †Philonthus abavus
 †Philonthus horni – type locality for species
 †Philonthus invelatus – type locality for species
 †Philonthus marcidulus – type locality for species
 †Philoponites
 †Philoponites praefractus – type locality for species
 †Philorites – type locality for genus
 †Philorites johannseni – type locality for species
 †Philorites pallescens – type locality for species
   †Phlaocyon
 †Phlaocyon leucosteus – type locality for species
 †Phloeonemites – type locality for genus
 †Phloeonemites miocenus – type locality for species
 Phloeosinus
 †Phloeosinus scopulorum
 Phloeotribus
 †Phloeotribus zimmermanni – type locality for species
 †Phora
 †Phora tumbae – type locality for species
 †Phrudopamera – type locality for genus
 †Phrudopamera chittendeni – type locality for species
 †Phrudopamera wilsoni – type locality for species
 Phryganea
 †Phryganea labefacta – type locality for species
 †Phryganea miocenica – type locality for species
 †Phryganea wickhami – type locality for species
   Phrynosoma
 †Phrynosoma douglassi
 †Phthinocoris – type locality for genus
 †Phthinocoris colligatus – type locality for species
 †Phthinocoris languidus – type locality for species
 †Phthinocoris lethargicus – type locality for species
 †Phthinocoris petraeus – type locality for species
 †Phylledestes – type locality for genus
 †Phylledestes vorax – type locality for species
 †Phyllites
 †Phyllites pagosensis
 †Phyllobaenus
 †Phyllobaenus wolcotti – type locality for species
Phyllobius
 †Phyllobius antecessor – type locality for species
   †Phyllophaga
 †Phyllophaga avus
 †Phyllophaga disrupta – type locality for species
 †Phyllophaga extincta – type locality for species
 †Phymatodes
 †Phymatodes grandaevus – type locality for species
 †Phymatodes miocenicus – type locality for species
 †Phymatodes volans – type locality for species
 Pica
   †Pica hudsonia
 Picea
 †Picea lahontense
 †Picea magna – type locality for species
 †Picea pinifructus
 Picoides
 †Picoides villosus
 †Pidonia
 †Pidonia ingenua – type locality for species
 †Pidonia leidyi – type locality for species
 †Piesma – tentative report
 †Piesma rotunda – type locality for species
 †Piezocoris – type locality for genus
 †Piezocoris compactilis – type locality for species
 †Piezocoris peremptus – type locality for species
 †Piezocoris peritus – type locality for species
   †Pimpla
 †Pimpla appendigera – type locality for species
 †Pimpla eocenica – type locality for species
 †Pimpla morticina – type locality for species
 †Pimpla rediviva – type locality for species
 †Pimpla revelata – type locality for species
 †Pimpla senilis – type locality for species
 Pinus
 †Pinus florissanti
 †Pinus hambachi
 †Pinus wheeleri
 †Pipiza
 †Pipiza melanderi – type locality for species
 †Pison
 †Pison cockerellae – type locality for species
 Pituophis
   †Pituophis melanoleucus
 Pityophthorus
 †Pityophthorus opaculus
 †Plagiopodiopsis
 †Plagiopodiopsis cockerelliae
 †Plagiopodiopsis scudderi
 †Planocephalus – type locality for genus
 †Planocephalus aselloides – type locality for species
 Planolinoides
 †Planolinoides duplex
 †Plastomenus – tentative report
 †Plastomenus lachrymalis
 †Platanites
 †Platanites marginata
   Platanus
 †Platanus florissanti – type locality for species
 †Platanus nobilis
 †Platanus raynoldsi
 †Platanus raynoldsii
 †Platanus wyomingensis
 Plateumaris
 †Plateumaris flavipes
 †Plateumaris germari
 †Plateumaris primaeva – type locality for species
 †Plateumaris pusilla
 †Platycheirus
 †Platycheirus lethaeus – type locality for species
 †Platycheirus persistens – type locality for species
 Platydema
 †Platydema antiquorum – type locality for species
 †Platydema bethunei – type locality for species
 †Platydracus
 †Platydracus breviantennatus – type locality for species
   †Platygonus
 †Platygonus pollenae
 Platynus
 †Platynus florissantensis – type locality for species
 †Platynus insculptipennis – type locality for species
 †Platynus tartareus – type locality for species
 †Platypedia
 †Platypedia primigenia – type locality for species
 †Platyphylax
 †Platyphylax florissantensis – type locality for species
 Platystethus
 †Platystethus archetypus – type locality for species
 †Platystethus carcareus – type locality for species
   Plecia
 †Plecia akerionana
 †Plecia axeliana – type locality for species
 †Plecia decapitata – type locality for species
 †Plecia explanata – type locality for species
 †Plecia gradata – type locality for species
 †Plecia melanderi – type locality for species
 †Plecia orycta – type locality for species
 †Plecia rhodopterina – type locality for species
 †Plecia tessella – type locality for species
 †Plecia winchesteri – type locality for species
 †Plectiscidea
 †Plectiscidea lanhami – type locality for species
 †Plectrotetrophanes – type locality for genus
 †Plectrotetrophanes hageni – type locality for species
 †Plesiadapis
 †Plesiadapis dubius
 †Plesiadapis fodinatus
 †Plesiobaena
 †Plesiobaena antiqua – or unidentified comparable form
 †Plesiosorex
 †Plesiosorex coloradensis – type locality for species
 †Pleurolicus
   †Pliohippus
 †Pliohippus mirabilis – type locality for species
 †Plionictis
 †Plionictis ogygia
 †Plochionus
 †Plochionus lesquereuxi – type locality for species
 †Poabromylus
 Podabrus
 †Podabrus cupesoides – type locality for species
 †Podabrus florissantensis – type locality for species
 †Podabrus fragmentatus – type locality for species
 †Podabrus wheeleri – type locality for species
   Podiceps
 Podilymbus
 †Podilymbus podiceps
  †Poebrotherium
 †Poebrotherium eximium
 †Poebrotherium wilsoni
 †Poecilocapsus
 †Poecilocapsus fremontii – type locality for species
 †Poecilocapsus ostentus – type locality for species
 †Poecilocapsus tabidus – type locality for species
 †Poecilocapsus veterandus – type locality for species
 †Poecilocapsus veternosus – type locality for species
 †Poecilognathus – type locality for genus
 †Poecilognathus stigmalis – type locality for species
   †Pogonomyrmex
 †Pogonomyrmex fossilis – type locality for species
 †Polemius
 †Polemius crassicornis – type locality for species
 †Poliocoris – type locality for genus
 †Poliocoris amnesis – type locality for species
 †Polioschistus – type locality for genus
 †Polioschistus lapidarius – type locality for species
 †Polioschistus ligatus – type locality for species
 †Poliosphageus – type locality for genus
 †Poliosphageus psychrus – type locality for species
 Polycentropus
 †Polycentropus aeternus – type locality for species
 †Polycentropus eviratus – type locality for species
 †Polycentropus exesus – type locality for species
 Polygraphus
 †Polygraphus rufipennis
 †Polygraphus wortheni – type locality for species
 †Polysphincta
 †Polysphincta inundata – type locality for species
 †Polysphincta mortuaria – type locality for species
 †Polysphincta petrorum – type locality for species
 †Polystoechotites
 †Polystoechotites piperatus – type locality for species
 †Ponerites – type locality for genus
 †Ponerites coloradensis – type locality for species
 †Ponerites eocenicus – type locality for species
 †Ponerites hypoponeroides – type locality for species
 †Populites
 †Populites heeri
Populus
 †Populus cinnamomoides
 †Populus crassa
 †Populus pyrifolia
 †Populus wilmattae
 †Porizon
 †Porizon exsectus – type locality for species
 Porzana
   †Porzana carolina
 †Potamogeton
 †Potamogeton geniculatus
 †Potamogeton verticillatus
 †Poteschistus – type locality for genus
 †Poteschistus obnubilus – type locality for species
 †Praepapilio – type locality for genus
 †Praepapilio colorado – type locality for species
 †Praepapilio gracilis – type locality for species
 †Priabona
 †Priabona florissantius – type locality for species
 †Prinecphora – type locality for genus
 †Prinecphora balteata – type locality for species
 †Pristaulacus – type locality for genus
 †Pristaulacus rohweri – type locality for species
 †Pristaulacus secundus – type locality for species
 †Pristichampsus
 †Proapemon – type locality for genus
 †Proapemon infernus – type locality for species
 †Probathyopsis
 †Probathyopsis harrisorum – type locality for species
 †Procas
 †Procas verberatus – type locality for species
 †Procas vinculatus
 †Procerberus
 †Procerberus andesiticus – type locality for species
 †Procerberus grandis – type locality for species
 †Prochaetocnema – type locality for genus
 †Prochaetocnema florissantella – type locality for species
 †Procoris – type locality for genus
 †Procoris bechleri – type locality for species
 †Procoris sanctaejohannis – type locality for species
 †Procrophius – type locality for genus
 †Procrophius communis – type locality for species
 †Procrophius costalis – type locality for species
 †Procrophius languens – type locality for species
 †Proctotrypes
 †Proctotrypes exhumatus – type locality for species
 †Procydnus – type locality for genus
 †Procydnus devictus – type locality for species
 †Procydnus divexus – type locality for species
 †Procydnus eatoni – type locality for species
 †Procydnus mamillanus
 †Procydnus pronus – type locality for species
 †Procydnus quietus – type locality for species
 †Procydnus reliquus – type locality for species
 †Procydnus vesperus – type locality for species
 †Procymus – type locality for genus
 †Procymus cockerelli – type locality for species
 †Prodeporaides
 †Prodeporaides laminarum – type locality for species
 †Prodeporaides subterraneus – type locality for species
 †Prodeporaides vulcan – type locality for species
 †Prodeporaides wymani – type locality for species
 †Prodeporaus
 †Prodeporaus curiosum – type locality for species
 †Prodeporaus exanimale – type locality for species
 †Prodeporaus exilis – type locality for species
 †Prodeporaus minutissimus – type locality for species
 †Prodeporaus smithii – type locality for species
 †Prodiacodon
 †Prodiacodon tauricinerei
 †Prodipodomys
 †Prodipodomys centralis
   †Prodryas – type locality for genus
 †Prodryas persephone – type locality for species
 †Proelectrotermes
 †Proelectrotermes fodinae – type locality for species
 †Progloma – type locality for genus
 †Progloma rohweri – type locality for species
 †Proheteromys
 †Proheteromys sulculus
   †Proiridomyrmex – type locality for genus
 †Proiridomyrmex vetulus – type locality for species
 †Prokalotermes
 †Prokalotermes hagenii – type locality for species
 †Prolibythea – type locality for genus
 †Prolibythea florissanti – type locality for species
 †Prolibythea vagabunda – type locality for species
 †Prolimnocyon
 †Prolimnocyon atavus
 †Prolimnocyon haematus
 †Prolygaeus – type locality for genus
 †Prolygaeus inundatus – type locality for species
 †Promioclaenus
 †Promioclaenus acolytus
 †Pronemobius
 †Pronemobius ornatipes – type locality for species
 †Pronemobius tertiarius – tentative report
 †Propalaeanodon
 †Prophilanthus – type locality for genus
 †Prophilanthus destructus – type locality for species
 †Proscalops
 †Proscalops miocaenus – type locality for species
 †Proscalops secundus – or unidentified comparable form
 †Prosigara – type locality for genus
 †Prosigara flabellum – type locality for species
 †Prosoeca – type locality for genus
 †Prosoeca florigera – type locality for species
Prosopis
 †Prosopis linearfolia
 †Protacnaeus – type locality for genus
 †Protacnaeus tenuicornis – type locality for species
 †Protapate – type locality for genus
 †Protapate contorta – type locality for species
   †Protazteca – type locality for genus
 †Protazteca capitata – type locality for species
 †Protazteca elongata – type locality for species
 †Protazteca hendersoni – type locality for species
 †Protazteca quadrata – type locality for species
 †Proteleates – type locality for genus
 †Proteleates centralis – type locality for species
 †Protenor
 †Protenor imbecillis – type locality for species
 †Protictis
 †Protictis proteus
 †Protipochus – type locality for genus
 †Protipochus vandykei – type locality for species
 †Protochrysotoxum – type locality for genus
 †Protochrysotoxum sphinx – type locality for species
 †Protoedalea
 †Protoedalea brachystoma – type locality for species
   †Protohippus
 †Protoibalia
 †Protoibalia connexiva – type locality for species
 †Protolabis
 †Protolabis heterodontus
 †Protoliarus – type locality for genus
 †Protoliarus amabilis – type locality for species
 †Protoliarus humatus – type locality for species
 †Protomarctus
 †Protomarctus optatus
 †Protomelecta – type locality for genus
 †Protomelecta brevipennis – type locality for species
 †Protoncideres – type locality for genus
 †Protoncideres primus – type locality for species
 †Protoplatycera – type locality for genus
 †Protoplatycera laticornis – type locality for species
 †Protoreodon
 †Protorohippus
 †Protorohippus venticolum
 †Protospermophilus
 †Protospermophilus kelloggi
 †Protostephanus – type locality for genus
 †Protostephanus ashmeadi – type locality for species
 †Prototomus
 †Prototomus deimos
 †Prototomus martis
 †Prototomus phobos
 †Prototomus secundarius
 †Protungulatum
   †Protungulatum donnae
 Prunus
 †Prunus coloradensis
 †Prunus corrugis
   †Prunus gracilis
 †Psammaecius
 †Psammaecius sepultus – type locality for species
 †Psapharochus
 †Psapharochus lengii – type locality for species
 †Psephenus
 †Psephenus lutulentus – type locality for species
   Pseudacris
   †Pseudacris triseriata
  †Pseudaelurus
 †Pseudaelurus stouti
   †Pseudhipparion
 †Pseudocimbex – type locality for genus
 †Pseudocimbex clavatus – type locality for species
 †Pseudocylindrodon
 †Pseudocylindrodon neglectus – or unidentified comparable form
 †Pseudomesauletes
 †Pseudomesauletes culex – type locality for species
 †Pseudomesauletes ibis – type locality for species
 †Pseudomesauletes obliquus – type locality for species
 †Pseudomesauletes striaticeps – type locality for species
Pseudomyrmex
 †Pseudomyrmex extinctus – type locality for species
   †Pseudoprotoceras
 †Pseudoprotoceras longinaris
 †Pseudosiobla
 †Pseudosiobla megoura – type locality for species
 †Pseudosiobla misera – type locality for species
 †Pseudosmylidia – type locality for genus
 †Pseudosmylidia relicta – type locality for species
 †Pseudotetonius
 †Pseudotetonius ambiguus
 †Pseudotheridomys
 †Pseudotheridomys hesperus
 †Pseudotrimylus
 †Pseudotrimylus compressus
 †Pseudotrimylus roperi
   †Psittacotherium
Ptelea
 †Ptelea cassiodes
Pterocarya
 †Pterocarya hispida
 †Pterocarya roanensis – type locality for species
 †Pterogaulus
 †Pterogaulus laevis
 †Pteromalus
 †Pteromalus exanimis – type locality for species
 †Pteromogoplistes
 †Pteromogoplistes grandis – type locality for species
 †Pteromogoplistes smithii – tentative report
 †Pteronus
 †Pteronus prodigus – type locality for species
Pterostichus
 †Pterostichus pumpellyi – type locality for species
 †Pterostichus walcotti
 †Pterotriamescaptor – tentative report
 †Pterotriamescaptor americanus – type locality for species
     †Ptilodus
 †Ptilodus kummae
 †Ptosima
 †Ptosima abyssa – type locality for species
 †Ptosima schaefferi – type locality for species
 †Ptosima silvatica – type locality for species
 †Ptychoptera
 †Ptychoptera miocenica – type locality for species
 †Pulverflumen
 Pycnoglypta
 †Pycnoglypta lurida
 †Pythoceropsis – type locality for genus
 †Pythoceropsis singularis – type locality for species

Q

 †Quadratomus
 †Quadratomus grandis
 Quedius
 †Quedius breweri – type locality for species
 †Quedius chamberlini – type locality for species
 †Quedius mortuus – type locality for species
   Quercus
 †Quercus balaninorum
 †Quercus dumosoides
 †Quercus greenlandica
 †Quercus knowltoniana
 †Quercus lyratiformis
 †Quercus mohavensis
 †Quercus orbata
 †Quercus perdayana – type locality for species
 †Quercus peritula
 †Quercus schottii
 †Quercus scottii
 †Quercus scudderi
 †Quercus sullyi

R

 Rallus
   †Rallus limicola
   †Ramoceros
 †Ramoceros osborni
 †Rana
 †Rana catesbeiana
 †Raphidia
 †Raphidia creedei – type locality for species
 †Reichertella
 †Reichertella fasciata – type locality for species
 Reithrodontomys
 †Reithroparamys
 †Reithroparamys debequensis – type locality for species
 †Rembus – tentative report
 †Rembus henshawi – type locality for species
 Reticulitermes
 †Reticulitermes creedei – type locality for species
 †Reticulitermes fossarum – type locality for species
 Rhabdomastix
 †Rhabdomastix frigida – type locality for species
 †Rhabdomastix labefactata – type locality for species
 †Rhabdomastix praecursor – type locality for species
 †Rhabdomastix primogenitalis
 †Rhabdomastix profundi – type locality for species
 †Rhabdomastix scudderi – type locality for species
 †Rhadinobrochus
 †Rhadinobrochus extinctus – type locality for species
   †Rhagio
 †Rhagio fossitius – type locality for species
 †Rhagio wheeleri – type locality for species
 †Rhagoderidea – type locality for genus
 †Rhagoderidea striata – type locality for species
Rhagonycha
 †Rhagonycha hesperus – type locality for species
 †Rhamnites
 †Rhamnites pseudostenophyllus
 †Rhamnus
 †Rhamnus cleburni
 †Rhamnus goldiana
   †Rhamphomyia
 †Rhamphomyia aeterna – type locality for species
 †Rhamphomyia craterae – type locality for species
 †Rhamphomyia enena – type locality for species
 †Rhamphomyia fossa – type locality for species
 †Rhamphomyia hypolitha – type locality for species
 †Rhamphomyia inanimata – type locality for species
 †Rhamphomyia infernalis – type locality for species
 †Rhamphomyia interita – type locality for species
 †Rhamphomyia morticina – type locality for species
 †Rhamphomyia senecta – type locality for species
 †Rhamphomyia sepulta – type locality for species
 †Rhamphomyia spodites – type locality for species
 †Rhamphomyia tumulata – type locality for species
 †Rhepocoris – type locality for genus
 †Rhepocoris macrescens – type locality for species
 †Rhepocoris minima – type locality for species
 †Rhepocoris praetectus – type locality for species
 †Rhepocoris praevalens – type locality for species
 †Rhepocoris propinquans – type locality for species
 Rhineastes
 †Rhineastes peltatus
 †Rhineastes smithi
   Rhineura
 †Rhineura hatcheri
 †Rhineura hatcherii – type locality for species
 †Rhingia
 †Rhingia zephyrea – type locality for species
 †Rhingiopsis
 †Rhingiopsis prisculus – type locality for species
 Rhizophagus
 †Rhizophagus remotus
  Rhus
 †Rhus lesquereuxi
 †Rhus migricans
 †Rhus nigricans
 †Rhus obscura
 †Rhus stellariaefolia
 †Rhyparochromus
 †Rhyparochromus verrillii – type locality for species
 †Rhysosternum
 †Rhysosternum aeternabile – type locality for species
 †Rhysosternum longirostre – type locality for species
 †Rhyssa
 †Rhyssa petiolata – type locality for species
 †Rhyssomatus
 †Rhyssomatus tabescens – type locality for species
 †Ribes
 †Ribes errans – type locality for species
 †Riodinella – type locality for genus
 †Riodinella nympha – type locality for species
 †Robinia
 †Robinia lesquereuxi
 †Robinia wardi
 †Rogas
 †Rogas tertiarius – type locality for species
 Rosa
 †Rosa hilliae
   †Rothschildia
 †Rothschildia fossilis – type locality for species
Rubus
 †Rubus coloradensis
 †Runaria – type locality for genus
 †Runaria ostenta – type locality for species
 †Rupiforficula
 †Rupiforficula inferna – type locality for species
 †Rupiforficula labens – type locality for species
 †Rupiforficula scudderi – type locality for species

S

   Sabal
 †Sabal grayana
 †Sabal imperialis
 †Saccoloma
 †Saccoloma gardneri
 †Sackenia – type locality for genus
 †Sackenia arcuata – type locality for species
 Salix
 †Salix coloradensis
 †Salix coloradica – type locality for species
 †Salix libbeyi
 †Salix longiacuminata
 †Salix longipetiolatum – or unidentified comparable form
 †Salix ramaleyi
 †Salix taxifolioides
 †Sambucus
 †Sambucus newtoni
   †Saniwa
 †Saperda
 †Saperda caroli – type locality for species
 †Saperda florissantensis – type locality for species
 †Saperdirhynchus – type locality for genus
 †Saperdirhynchus priscotitillator – type locality for species
 †Sapindus
 †Sapindus coloradensis
 †Sapromyza
 †Sapromyza veterana – type locality for species
 †Saropogon
 †Saropogon oblitescens – type locality for species
 Sassafras
 †Sassafras CR010 informal
   †Sassafras hesperia
 †Sassafras thermale
 †Scalopoides
 †Scalopoides isodens
 Scaphinotus
 †Scaphinotus serus – type locality for species
 †Scaptolenopsis – type locality for genus
 †Scaptolenopsis wilmattae – type locality for species
 Sceloporus
   †Sceloporus undulatus
 †Scenopagus
 †Scenopagus edenensis
 †Scenopagus priscus
 †Schaubeumys
 †Schaubeumys clivosus
 †Schaubeumys galbreathi
 †Schmaltzia
 †Schmaltzia vexans
 †Sciabregma – type locality for genus
 †Sciabregma rugosa – type locality for species
 †Sciabregma tenuicornis – type locality for species
 Sciara
 †Sciara dormitans – type locality for species
 †Sciara florissantensis – type locality for species
 †Sciara requieta – type locality for species
 †Sciara sopora – type locality for species
 Sciomyza
 †Sciomyza florissantensis – type locality for species
 †Sciomyza manca
 †Sciophila
 †Sciophila mirandula – type locality for species
 †Sciuravus
   Sciurus
Scolytus
 †Scolytus piceae
 †Scoparidea – type locality for genus
 †Scoparidea nebulosa – type locality for species
 †Scottimus
 †Scottimus ambiguus
 †Scyphophorus
 †Scyphophorus fossionis – type locality for species
 †Scyphophorus laevis – type locality for species
 †Scyphophorus tertiarius – type locality for species
 †Scythropus
 †Scythropus somniculosus – type locality for species
 †Segestria
 †Segestria scudderi – type locality for species
 †Segestria secessa
   †Selaginella
 †Selaginella berthoudi
 †Selandria
 †Selandria sapindi – type locality for species
 †Semanotus
 †Semanotus puncticollis – type locality for species
 †Senoprosopis
 †Senoprosopis antiquus – type locality for species
 †Senoprosopis borealis – type locality for species
 †Senoprosopis eureka – type locality for species
 †Senoprosopis romeri – type locality for species
 Sequoia
   †Sequoia affinis
 Serica
 †Serica antediluviana – type locality for species
 †Serica cockerelli – type locality for species
 †Sespia
 †Sespia nitida
 †Setodes
 †Setodes abbreviata – type locality for species
 †Setodes portionalis – type locality for species
 †Sialia
 †Sibinia
 †Sibinia whitneyi – type locality for species
 †Sifrhippus
 †Sifrhippus grangeri
 †Sigaretta
 †Sigaretta florissantella – type locality for species
 Sigmodon
 †Sigmodon curtisi
 †Sigmodon minor
 †Silpha
 †Silpha beutenmuelleri – type locality for species
 †Silpha colorata – type locality for species
 †Silvius
 †Silvius merychippi – type locality for species
 Simplocaria
 †Simplocaria tessellata
 †Simpsonlemur
 †Simpsonlemur jepseni
 †Simpsonodus
 †Simpsonodus chacensis
 †Sinclairella
 †Sinclairella dakotensis
   †Sinonyx – or unidentified comparable form
 †Siphlurites – type locality for genus
 †Siphlurites explanatus – type locality for species
 †Siphonophoroides – type locality for genus
 †Siphonophoroides antiqua – type locality for species
 †Siphonophoroides gillettei – type locality for species
 †Siphonophoroides lassa – type locality for species
 †Siphonophoroides pennatus – type locality for species
 †Siphonophoroides simplex – type locality for species
Sitona
 †Sitona exitiorum – type locality for species
 †Sitona paginarum
 †Sitones
 †Sitones exitiorum
 Sitta
 †Sitta carolinensis
 †Smicrorhynchus
 †Smicrorhynchus macgeei
 †Smilax
 †Smilax labidurommae
   †Smilodectes
 †Smilodectes gracilis
 †Smilodectes mcgrewi
 †Solenopsites – type locality for genus
 †Solenopsites minutus – type locality for species
 Sonoma
 †Sonoma margemina
 Sorex
 †Sorex arcticus
 †Sorex hoyi
 †Sparganium
 †Sparganium antiquum
 Spea
   †Spea bombifrons
 †Spermophagus
 †Spermophagus pluto – type locality for species
 †Spermophagus vivificatus – type locality for species
 Spermophilus
 †Spermophilus elegans – or unidentified comparable form
 †Spermophilus lateralis
   †Spermophilus richardsonii
 †Spermophilus tridecemlineatus
 †Sphegina
 †Sphegina obscura – type locality for species
   †Sphenocoelus
 †Sphenocoelus uintensis
 †Spiladomyia – type locality for genus
 †Spiladomyia simplex – type locality for species
 †Spiladopygia
 †Spiladopygia exsulata – type locality for species
 †Spiladopygia mortalis – type locality for species
 Spilogale
 †Spilogale putorius
 †Spiniphora
 †Spiniphora cockerelli – type locality for species
 Spizella
   †Spizella breweri
 †Spodotribus – type locality for genus
 †Spodotribus terrulentus – type locality for species
 †Staphylea
 †Staphylea acuminata
 †Staphylea minutidens
 Staphylinus
 †Staphylinus lesleyi
 †Staphylinus vetulus – type locality for species
 †Staphylinus vulcan – type locality for species
 †Steganus – type locality for genus
 †Steganus barrandei – type locality for species
 †Stenoechinus
 †Stenoechinus tantalus
 †Stenogomphus – type locality for genus
 †Stenogomphus carletoni – type locality for species
   †Stenolophus
 †Stenolophus religatus – type locality for species
 †Stenopamera – type locality for genus
 †Stenopamera subterrea – type locality for species
 †Stenopamera tenebrosa – type locality for species
 †Stenosphenus
 †Stenosphenus pristinus – type locality for species
 †Stenovelia – type locality for genus
 †Stenovelia nigra – type locality for species
 Stenus
 †Stenus morsei – type locality for species
   Sterculia
 †Sterculia rigida
 †Sterictiphora
 †Sterictiphora konowi – type locality for species
 †Stibarus
 †Stibarus obtusilobus
 †Stibarus quadricuspis
 Stilbus
 †Stilbus pallidus
 †Stipa
 †Stipa florissanti
 †Stolopsyche – type locality for genus
 †Stolopsyche libytheoides – type locality for species
 †Strategus
 †Strategus cessatus – type locality for species
 †Stratimus
 †Stratimus strobeli
 †Striaderes – type locality for genus
 †Striaderes conradi – type locality for species
 †Strigorhysis
 †Strigorhysis huerfanensis – type locality for species
 †Stygiochelys
 †Stygiochelys estesi
 †Stylinodon
 †Stylinodon mirus
   †Subhyracodon
 †Subhyracodon mitis – type locality for species
 †Subhyracodon occidentalis
 †Submeryceros
 †Submeryceros minor
   Sylvilagus
 †Sylvilagus audubonii
 †Symphoromyia
 †Symphoromyia subtrita – type locality for species
 †Synchroa
 †Synchroa quiescens – type locality for species
 †Syntomostylus
 †Syntomostylus rudis
 Syrphus
 †Syrphus aphidopsidis – type locality for species
 †Syrphus carpenteri – type locality for species
 †Syrphus eocenicus – type locality for species
 †Syrphus hendersoni – type locality for species
 †Syrphus lithaphidis – type locality for species
 †Syrphus petrographicus – type locality for species
 †Syrphus platychiralis – type locality for species
 †Syrphus willistoni – type locality for species
 †Systena
 †Systena florissantensis – type locality for species

T

 †Tabanus
 †Tabanus hipparionis – type locality for species
 †Tabanus parahippi – type locality for species
 Tachinus
 †Tachinus angustatus
 †Tachinus elongatus
 †Tachinus fimbriatus
 †Tachinus schwarzi
 †Tachinus sommatus – type locality for species
 Tachycineta
   †Tachycineta bicolor
 †Tachypeza
 †Tachypeza primitiva – type locality for species
 Tachyporus
 †Tachyporus annosus – type locality for species
 †Tachyporus nimbicola
 †Tachys
 †Tachys haywardi – type locality for species
 †Taeniopodites – type locality for genus
 †Taeniopodites pardalis – type locality for species
 †Taeniurites – type locality for genus
 †Taeniurites fortis – type locality for species
 †Tagalodes – type locality for genus
 †Tagalodes inermis – type locality for species
 †Talpavus
 Tamiasciurus
   †Tamiasciurus hudsonicus
 Tanysphyrus
   †Tanysphyrus lemnae
 †Taphacris – type locality for genus
 †Taphacris bittaciformis – type locality for species
 †Taphacris reliquata – type locality for species
 †Tapholyda
 †Tapholyda caplani – type locality for species
 Tapirus
 †Tapirus haysii
 †Taracticus
 †Taracticus contusus – type locality for species
 †Taracticus hypogaeus – type locality for species
 †Taracticus renovatus – type locality for species
 Taxidea
 †Taxidea taxus
   †Teilhardina
   †Teleoceras
 †Teleoceras americanum – type locality for species
 †Teleoceras hicksi
 †Teleoceras medicornutum
 †Teleocoris – type locality for genus
 †Teleocoris pothetias – type locality for species
 †Teleoschistus
 †Teleoschistus placatus – type locality for species
 †Teleoschistus rigoratus – type locality for species
 †Tenebrionites
 †Tenebrionites alatus – type locality for species
 †Tenebroides
 †Tenebroides corrugata – type locality for species
 †Tenillus – type locality for genus
 †Tenillus firmus – type locality for species
 †Tenor – type locality for genus
 †Tenor speluncae – type locality for species
 †Tenthredella
 †Tenthredella fenestralis – type locality for species
 †Tenthredella oblita – type locality for species
 †Tenthredella toddi – type locality for species
   †Tenthredo
 †Tenthredo avia – type locality for species
 †Tenthredo infossa – type locality for species
 †Tenthredo saxorum – type locality for species
 †Tenthredo submersa – type locality for species
 †Teretrum
 †Teretrum primulum – type locality for species
 †Tethneus
 †Tethneus guyoti
 †Tethneus hentzi – type locality for species
 †Tethneus obduratus – type locality for species
 †Tethneus provectus – type locality for species
 †Tethneus robustus – type locality for species
 †Tethneus twenhofeli – type locality for species
 †Tetigonia
 †Tetigonia obtecta – type locality for species
 †Tetigonia priscotincta – type locality for species
 †Tetonius
 †Tetonius matthewi
 †Tetonius mckennai – type locality for species
   †Tetragnatha
 †Tetragnatha tertiaria – type locality for species
 †Tetragoneura
 †Tetragoneura peritula – type locality for species
 †Tetraonyx
 †Tetraonyx minuscula – type locality for species
 †Tetraopes
 †Tetraopes submersus – type locality for species
 †Tetrapus
 †Tetrapus mayri – type locality for species
 Tetratoma
 †Tetratoma concolor
 †Tettoraptor – type locality for genus
 †Tettoraptor maculatus – type locality for species
 †Texasophis
 †Texasophis fossilis
 †Texasophis galbreathi – type locality for species
 †Texoceros
 †Texoceros vaughani – type locality for species
 Thamnophis
   †Thamnophis elegans
   †Thamnophis sirtalis
 †Thamnotettix
 †Thamnotettix eocenicus – type locality for species
 †Thamnotettix fundi – type locality for species
 †Thamnotettix packardi – type locality for species
 †Thanasimus
 †Thanasimus florissantensis – type locality for species
 Thanatophilus
 †Thanatophilus coloradensis
 †Thaumastocladius – type locality for genus
 †Thaumastocladius simplex – type locality for species
   †Themira
 †Themira saxifica – type locality for species
 †Theronia
 †Theronia wickhami – type locality for species
 †Thisbemys
 †Thisbemys elachistos
 †Thisbemys perditus – type locality for species
 †Thlibomenus – type locality for genus
 †Thlibomenus limosus – type locality for species
 †Thlibomenus macer – type locality for species
 †Thlibomenus parvus – type locality for species
 †Thlibomenus perennatus – type locality for species
 †Thlibomenus petreus – type locality for species
 †Thlimmoschistus – type locality for genus
 †Thlimmoschistus gravidatus – type locality for species
 †Thnetoschistus – type locality for genus
 †Thnetoschistus revulsus – type locality for species
   †Thomisus
 †Thomisus defossus – type locality for species
 †Thomisus disjunctus – type locality for species
 †Thomisus resutus – type locality for species
   Thomomys
 †Thomomys talpoides
 †Thouinia
 †Thouinia straciata
 †Thryptacodon
 †Thryptacodon antiquus
 †Thryptacodon australis – type locality for species
 †Thuja
 †Thuja interrupta
 †Thylacodon
 †Thylacodon montanensis
 †Thylacodon pusillus
   †Ticholeptus
Tilia
 †Tilia populifolia
 †Tillomys
 †Tillomys senex – or unidentified comparable form
 †Tingis
 †Tingis florissantensis – type locality for species
 †Tinodes – tentative report
 †Tinodes paludigena – type locality for species
Tipula – type locality for genus
 †Tipula bilineata – type locality for species
 †Tipula carolinae – type locality for species
 †Tipula carpenteri – type locality for species
 †Tipula clauda
 †Tipula consumpta – type locality for species
 †Tipula evanitura
 †Tipula florissanta
 †Tipula fmartinbrowni – type locality for species
 †Tipula heilprini – type locality for species
 †Tipula hepialina – type locality for species
 †Tipula internecata
 †Tipula lapillescens – type locality for species
 †Tipula lethaea – type locality for species
 †Tipula limi
 †Tipula maclurei
 †Tipula magnifica – type locality for species
 †Tipula needhami – type locality for species
 †Tipula paludis – type locality for species
 †Tipula picta – type locality for species
 †Tipula reliquiae – type locality for species
 †Tipula revivificata – type locality for species
 †Tipula rigens
 †Tipula subterjacens – type locality for species
 †Tipula tartari – type locality for species
 †Tipula wilmatteae – type locality for species
 †Tipulidea
 †Tipulidea distincta
 †Tiromerus – type locality for genus
 †Tiromerus tabifluus – type locality for species
 †Tiromerus torpefactus – type locality for species
 †Tiroschistus – type locality for genus
 †Tiroschistus indurescens – type locality for species
 †Titanoeca
 †Titanoeca ingenua – type locality for species
   †Titanoides
 †Titanoides looki
 †Titanoides primaevus
 †Tithonomyia
 †Tithonomyia atra – type locality for species
   †Tomarctus
 †Tomarctus brevirostris – type locality for species
 †Tomoxia
 †Tomoxia inundata – type locality for species
 †Torreya
 †Torreya geometrorum
 †Tortricites
 †Tortricites destructus – type locality for species
   †Tortrix
 †Tortrix florissantana – type locality for species
 †Torymus
 †Torymus sackeni – type locality for species
 †Toxorhynchus
 †Toxorhynchus arctus
 †Toxorhynchus confectum – type locality for species
 †Toxorhynchus corruptus – type locality for species
 †Toxorhynchus florissantensis – type locality for species
 †Toxorhynchus grandis – type locality for species
 †Toxorhynchus minusculus – type locality for species
 †Toxorhynchus oculatus – type locality for species
 †Toxorhynchus pumilum
 †Toxorhynchus refrenatum – type locality for species
 †Toxorhynchus reventus – type locality for species
 †Toxorhynchus scudderianum – type locality for species
 †Tracheliodes
 †Tracheliodes mortuellus – type locality for species
 †Trapezonotus
 †Trapezonotus exterminatus – type locality for species
 †Trapezonotus stygialis – type locality for species
   Trechus
 †Trechus fractus – type locality for species
 †Tribochrysa – type locality for genus
 †Tribochrysa firmata – type locality for species
 †Tribochrysa inequalis – type locality for species
 †Tricentes
 †Tricentes subtrigonus
 †Trichilia
 †Trichilia florissanti
 †Trichiosomites – type locality for genus
 †Trichiosomites obliviosus – type locality for species
 †Triga
 †Triga coeni – type locality for species
 †Trigonias
 †Trigonias osborni – type locality for species
 †Trigonorhinus
 †Trigonorhinus sordidus – type locality for species
 †Trigonoscuta
 †Trigonoscuta inventa – type locality for species
 †Triplax
 †Triplax diluviana – type locality for species
 †Triplax materna – type locality for species
 †Triplax petrefacta – type locality for species
 †Triplax submersa – type locality for species
 †Triplopus
 †Triplopus implicatus
 †Trirhabda
 †Trirhabda majuscula – type locality for species
 †Trirhabda megacephala – type locality for species
 †Trirhabda sepulta
   †Tritemnodon
 †Tritemnodon strenuus – or unidentified comparable form
 †Triumfetta
 †Triumfetta ovata – type locality for species
 Trixagus
 †Trixagus sericeus
 †Trixoscelis
 †Trixoscelis patefacta – type locality for species
 †Trogosus
 †Trogosus grangeri
 Trogoxylon
 †Trogoxylon parallelopipedum
 †Trogus
 †Trogus vetus – type locality for species
 †Tropideres
 †Tropideres vastatus – type locality for species
 †Tropisternus
 †Tropisternus limitatus – type locality for species
 †Tropisternus vanus – type locality for species
   Trox
 †Trox antiquus – type locality for species
 †Trypherus
 †Trypherus aboriginalis – type locality for species
 †Tryphon
 †Tryphon amasidis – type locality for species
 †Tryphon cadaver – type locality for species
 †Tryphon explanatum – type locality for species
 †Tryphon florissantensis – type locality for species
 †Tryphon lapideus – type locality for species
 †Tryphon peregrinus – type locality for species
 †Tryphon senex – type locality for species
 †Tychius
 †Tychius evolatus
 †Tychius ferox – type locality for species
 †Tychius secretus – type locality for species
 †Tylecomnus
 †Tylecomnus davisii – type locality for species
 †Tylecomnus pimploides – type locality for species
 †Tylocomnus
 †Tylocomnus creedensis – type locality for species
   Typha
 †Typha lesquereuxi
 †Tyrbula
 †Tyrbula russelli – type locality for species
 †Tyrbula scudderi – type locality for species

U

 †Ubiquitoxylon – type locality for genus
 †Ubiquitoxylon raynoldsii – type locality for species
 †Uintacyon
 †Uintacyon asodes
 †Uintacyon massetericus – or unidentified comparable form
 †Uintanius
 †Uintanius rutherfurdi
 †Uintascorpio – type locality for genus
 †Uintascorpio halandrasorum – type locality for species
   Ulmus
 †Ulmus rhamnifolia
 †Ulmus tenuinervis
 †Ulus
 †Ulus minutus – type locality for species
 Urocyon
   †Urocyon cinereoargenteus
 †Urolibellula – type locality for genus
 †Urolibellula eocenica – type locality for species
 †Urortalis
 †Urortalis caudatus – type locality for species
 †Urosigalphus
 †Urosigalphus aeternus – type locality for species
 †Ursavus
 †Ursavus pawniensis
 Ursus
   †Ursus americanus
 †Ustatochoerus
 †Ustatochoerus medius
 †Utemylus
 †Utemylus latomius – type locality for species
 †Utemylus serior

V

 †Vanessa
 †Vanessa amerindica – type locality for species
 †Vauquelinia
 †Vauquelinia coloradensis
 †Verrallites – type locality for genus
 †Verrallites cladurus – type locality for species
 †Viburnum
 †Viburnum goldianum
 †Viburnum solitarium
 †Vicia
 †Villa – type locality for genus
 †Villa setosa – type locality for species
   Vitis
 †Vitis lobata
 †Vitis olriki
 †Viverravus
 †Viverravus acutus
 †Viverravus gracilis
 †Viverravus lutosus
 †Viverravus minutus
 †Viverravus politus – or unidentified comparable form
 †Viverravus sicarius
 †Vrilletta
 †Vrilletta monstrosa – type locality for species
 †Vrilletta tenuistriata – type locality for species
   †Vulpavus
 †Vulpavus australis – or unidentified comparable form
 †Vulpavus canavus
 Vulpes
 †Vulpes stenognathus
 †Vulpes velox
   †Vulpes vulpes

W

 †Washakius
 †Washakius izetti – or unidentified comparable form
   †Weinmannia
 †Weinmannia phenacophylla
 †Wickia – type locality for genus
 †Wickia brevirhinus – type locality for species
 †Wilsoneumys
 †Wilsoneumys planidens
 †Wilsonosorex
 †Wilsonosorex conulatus
 †Woodwardia
 †Woodwardia arctica

X

   †Xantholinus
 †Xantholinus tenebrarius – type locality for species
 †Xenacodon
 †Xenacodon mutilatus – type locality for species
 †Xenicohippus
 †Xenicohippus craspedotum
 †Xenicohippus grangeri
 †Xenicohippus osborni
 †Xenoberotha – type locality for genus
 †Xenoberotha angustialata – type locality for species
 †Xestobium
 †Xestobium alutaceum – type locality for species
 Xyela
 †Xyela florissantensis – type locality for species
 Xyleborinus
 †Xyleborinus saxeseni
 †Xyleborites – type locality for genus
 †Xyleborites longipennis – type locality for species
 †Xylobiops
 †Xylobiops lacustre – type locality for species
   †Xylocopa
 †Xylocopa gabrielae – type locality for species
 †Xylomya
 †Xylomya inornata – type locality for species
 †Xylomyia
 †Xylomyia moratula – type locality for species
 †Xylonomus
 †Xylonomus sejugatus – type locality for species
 †Xyronomys
 †Xyronomys robinsoni – type locality for species

Y

 †Ylasoia
 †Ylasoia secunda – type locality for species
 †Yumaceras
 †Yumaceras figginsi

Z

 †Zacallites – type locality for genus
 †Zacallites balli – type locality for species
   Zamia
 †Zamia coloradensis
 †Zanycteris – type locality for genus
 †Zanycteris honeyi – type locality for species
 †Zanycteris paleocenus – type locality for species
 Zelkova
 †Zelkova nervosa
 †Zelkova planeroides
 †Zetobora
 †Zetobora brunneri – type locality for species
 †Zingiberites
 †Zingiberites dubius
 Zizyphus
 †Zizyphus fibrillosus
 †Zizyphus florissanti
 Zonotrichia
   †Zonotrichia leucophrys
 †Zootermopsis
 †Zootermopsis coloradensis – type locality for species
   †Zygolophodon

References

 

Cenozoic
Colorado
Colorado-related lists